

532001–532100 

|-bgcolor=#d6d6d6
| 532001 ||  || — || January 19, 2013 || Kitt Peak || Spacewatch ||  || align=right | 2.0 km || 
|-id=002 bgcolor=#d6d6d6
| 532002 ||  || — || June 19, 2010 || WISE || WISE || Tj (2.99) || align=right | 4.6 km || 
|-id=003 bgcolor=#d6d6d6
| 532003 ||  || — || February 17, 2013 || Kitt Peak || Spacewatch ||  || align=right | 2.5 km || 
|-id=004 bgcolor=#fefefe
| 532004 ||  || — || April 10, 2010 || Kitt Peak || Spacewatch ||  || align=right data-sort-value="0.58" | 580 m || 
|-id=005 bgcolor=#d6d6d6
| 532005 ||  || — || September 9, 2010 || Kitt Peak || Spacewatch ||  || align=right | 2.6 km || 
|-id=006 bgcolor=#fefefe
| 532006 ||  || — || March 15, 2010 || Kitt Peak || Spacewatch ||  || align=right data-sort-value="0.42" | 420 m || 
|-id=007 bgcolor=#d6d6d6
| 532007 ||  || — || February 14, 2013 || Haleakala || Pan-STARRS ||  || align=right | 2.3 km || 
|-id=008 bgcolor=#fefefe
| 532008 ||  || — || October 9, 2008 || Mount Lemmon || Mount Lemmon Survey ||  || align=right data-sort-value="0.64" | 640 m || 
|-id=009 bgcolor=#d6d6d6
| 532009 ||  || — || October 24, 2011 || Haleakala || Pan-STARRS ||  || align=right | 1.9 km || 
|-id=010 bgcolor=#d6d6d6
| 532010 ||  || — || February 10, 2002 || Socorro || LINEAR ||  || align=right | 3.2 km || 
|-id=011 bgcolor=#d6d6d6
| 532011 ||  || — || January 27, 2007 || Mount Lemmon || Mount Lemmon Survey || Tj (2.99) || align=right | 3.0 km || 
|-id=012 bgcolor=#d6d6d6
| 532012 ||  || — || October 27, 2005 || Kitt Peak || Spacewatch ||  || align=right | 2.8 km || 
|-id=013 bgcolor=#d6d6d6
| 532013 ||  || — || April 26, 2008 || Mount Lemmon || Mount Lemmon Survey || THM || align=right | 2.0 km || 
|-id=014 bgcolor=#fefefe
| 532014 ||  || — || August 24, 2000 || Socorro || LINEAR ||  || align=right data-sort-value="0.88" | 880 m || 
|-id=015 bgcolor=#d6d6d6
| 532015 ||  || — || April 14, 2008 || Mount Lemmon || Mount Lemmon Survey ||  || align=right | 2.1 km || 
|-id=016 bgcolor=#fefefe
| 532016 ||  || — || September 23, 2011 || Haleakala || Pan-STARRS || (1338) || align=right data-sort-value="0.91" | 910 m || 
|-id=017 bgcolor=#d6d6d6
| 532017 ||  || — || March 8, 2013 || Haleakala || Pan-STARRS ||  || align=right | 2.2 km || 
|-id=018 bgcolor=#fefefe
| 532018 ||  || — || October 25, 2011 || Haleakala || Pan-STARRS || V || align=right data-sort-value="0.80" | 800 m || 
|-id=019 bgcolor=#fefefe
| 532019 ||  || — || October 23, 2011 || Mount Lemmon || Mount Lemmon Survey || (2076) || align=right data-sort-value="0.94" | 940 m || 
|-id=020 bgcolor=#d6d6d6
| 532020 ||  || — || August 25, 1998 || Caussols || ODAS ||  || align=right | 2.4 km || 
|-id=021 bgcolor=#d6d6d6
| 532021 ||  || — || January 20, 2013 || Kitt Peak || Spacewatch || TIR || align=right | 2.0 km || 
|-id=022 bgcolor=#fefefe
| 532022 ||  || — || March 5, 2013 || Haleakala || Pan-STARRS ||  || align=right data-sort-value="0.81" | 810 m || 
|-id=023 bgcolor=#d6d6d6
| 532023 ||  || — || March 20, 2002 || Kitt Peak || Spacewatch ||  || align=right | 2.1 km || 
|-id=024 bgcolor=#d6d6d6
| 532024 ||  || — || January 28, 2007 || Kitt Peak || Spacewatch ||  || align=right | 2.4 km || 
|-id=025 bgcolor=#d6d6d6
| 532025 ||  || — || January 19, 2013 || Mount Lemmon || Mount Lemmon Survey ||  || align=right | 2.6 km || 
|-id=026 bgcolor=#C2E0FF
| 532026 ||  || — || May 9, 2010 || Haleakala || Pan-STARRS || other TNO || align=right | 280 km || 
|-id=027 bgcolor=#C2E0FF
| 532027 ||  || — || March 15, 2011 || Haleakala || Pan-STARRS || centaurcritical || align=right | 113 km || 
|-id=028 bgcolor=#d6d6d6
| 532028 ||  || — || February 10, 2007 || Mount Lemmon || Mount Lemmon Survey ||  || align=right | 2.4 km || 
|-id=029 bgcolor=#fefefe
| 532029 ||  || — || March 7, 2013 || Kitt Peak || Spacewatch ||  || align=right data-sort-value="0.70" | 700 m || 
|-id=030 bgcolor=#d6d6d6
| 532030 ||  || — || March 13, 2013 || Catalina || CSS ||  || align=right | 3.2 km || 
|-id=031 bgcolor=#d6d6d6
| 532031 ||  || — || February 9, 2007 || Kitt Peak || Spacewatch ||  || align=right | 3.0 km || 
|-id=032 bgcolor=#fefefe
| 532032 ||  || — || March 6, 2013 || Haleakala || Pan-STARRS ||  || align=right data-sort-value="0.83" | 830 m || 
|-id=033 bgcolor=#fefefe
| 532033 ||  || — || October 9, 2007 || Kitt Peak || Spacewatch || PHO || align=right data-sort-value="0.88" | 880 m || 
|-id=034 bgcolor=#fefefe
| 532034 ||  || — || February 25, 2006 || Kitt Peak || Spacewatch ||  || align=right data-sort-value="0.70" | 700 m || 
|-id=035 bgcolor=#fefefe
| 532035 ||  || — || March 14, 2013 || Catalina || CSS ||  || align=right data-sort-value="0.95" | 950 m || 
|-id=036 bgcolor=#fefefe
| 532036 ||  || — || September 24, 2011 || Haleakala || Pan-STARRS ||  || align=right data-sort-value="0.85" | 850 m || 
|-id=037 bgcolor=#C2E0FF
| 532037 ||  || — || March 17, 2013 || CTIO-DECam || S. S. Sheppard, C. Trujillo || SDOmooncritical || align=right | 1030 km || 
|-id=038 bgcolor=#C2E0FF
| 532038 ||  || — || March 17, 2013 || CTIO-DECam || S. S. Sheppard, C. Trujillo || cubewano? || align=right | 280 km || 
|-id=039 bgcolor=#C2E0FF
| 532039 ||  || — || January 29, 2011 || Haleakala || Pan-STARRS || res4:7 || align=right | 154 km || 
|-id=040 bgcolor=#fefefe
| 532040 ||  || — || March 13, 2013 || Haleakala || Pan-STARRS ||  || align=right data-sort-value="0.71" | 710 m || 
|-id=041 bgcolor=#fefefe
| 532041 ||  || — || November 30, 2008 || Mount Lemmon || Mount Lemmon Survey ||  || align=right data-sort-value="0.75" | 750 m || 
|-id=042 bgcolor=#d6d6d6
| 532042 ||  || — || July 5, 2010 || WISE || WISE ||  || align=right | 3.3 km || 
|-id=043 bgcolor=#d6d6d6
| 532043 ||  || — || March 8, 2013 || Haleakala || Pan-STARRS ||  || align=right | 4.4 km || 
|-id=044 bgcolor=#fefefe
| 532044 ||  || — || March 14, 2013 || Kitt Peak || Spacewatch ||  || align=right data-sort-value="0.74" | 740 m || 
|-id=045 bgcolor=#d6d6d6
| 532045 ||  || — || November 1, 2005 || Kitt Peak || Spacewatch ||  || align=right | 2.5 km || 
|-id=046 bgcolor=#d6d6d6
| 532046 ||  || — || April 15, 1996 || Kitt Peak || Spacewatch || Tj (2.99) || align=right | 2.9 km || 
|-id=047 bgcolor=#d6d6d6
| 532047 ||  || — || February 23, 2007 || Kitt Peak || Spacewatch ||  || align=right | 2.7 km || 
|-id=048 bgcolor=#d6d6d6
| 532048 ||  || — || March 8, 2013 || Haleakala || Pan-STARRS ||  || align=right | 2.7 km || 
|-id=049 bgcolor=#fefefe
| 532049 ||  || — || September 4, 2011 || Haleakala || Pan-STARRS ||  || align=right data-sort-value="0.72" | 720 m || 
|-id=050 bgcolor=#fefefe
| 532050 ||  || — || September 30, 2011 || Kitt Peak || Spacewatch ||  || align=right data-sort-value="0.71" | 710 m || 
|-id=051 bgcolor=#E9E9E9
| 532051 ||  || — || March 18, 2013 || Kitt Peak || Spacewatch ||  || align=right data-sort-value="0.78" | 780 m || 
|-id=052 bgcolor=#fefefe
| 532052 ||  || — || October 9, 2007 || Mount Lemmon || Mount Lemmon Survey ||  || align=right data-sort-value="0.64" | 640 m || 
|-id=053 bgcolor=#d6d6d6
| 532053 ||  || — || February 8, 2007 || Mount Lemmon || Mount Lemmon Survey || Tj (2.97) || align=right | 3.0 km || 
|-id=054 bgcolor=#fefefe
| 532054 ||  || — || April 10, 2013 || Haleakala || Pan-STARRS ||  || align=right data-sort-value="0.86" | 860 m || 
|-id=055 bgcolor=#d6d6d6
| 532055 ||  || — || March 9, 2007 || Mount Lemmon || Mount Lemmon Survey || THM || align=right | 1.9 km || 
|-id=056 bgcolor=#fefefe
| 532056 ||  || — || April 9, 2013 || Haleakala || Pan-STARRS ||  || align=right data-sort-value="0.67" | 670 m || 
|-id=057 bgcolor=#FA8072
| 532057 ||  || — || March 17, 2013 || Mount Lemmon || Mount Lemmon Survey ||  || align=right data-sort-value="0.64" | 640 m || 
|-id=058 bgcolor=#FFC2E0
| 532058 ||  || — || April 4, 2013 || Haleakala || Pan-STARRS || AMOcritical || align=right data-sort-value="0.49" | 490 m || 
|-id=059 bgcolor=#fefefe
| 532059 ||  || — || February 1, 2009 || Mount Lemmon || Mount Lemmon Survey || NYS || align=right data-sort-value="0.67" | 670 m || 
|-id=060 bgcolor=#fefefe
| 532060 ||  || — || March 31, 2013 || Mount Lemmon || Mount Lemmon Survey ||  || align=right data-sort-value="0.62" | 620 m || 
|-id=061 bgcolor=#E9E9E9
| 532061 ||  || — || April 12, 2013 || Haleakala || Pan-STARRS ||  || align=right | 1.4 km || 
|-id=062 bgcolor=#fefefe
| 532062 ||  || — || April 15, 2013 || Haleakala || Pan-STARRS ||  || align=right data-sort-value="0.66" | 660 m || 
|-id=063 bgcolor=#E9E9E9
| 532063 ||  || — || April 10, 2013 || Mount Lemmon || Mount Lemmon Survey ||  || align=right | 1.8 km || 
|-id=064 bgcolor=#fefefe
| 532064 ||  || — || April 10, 2013 || Haleakala || Pan-STARRS ||  || align=right data-sort-value="0.62" | 620 m || 
|-id=065 bgcolor=#fefefe
| 532065 ||  || — || April 11, 2013 || Mount Lemmon || Mount Lemmon Survey ||  || align=right data-sort-value="0.75" | 750 m || 
|-id=066 bgcolor=#E9E9E9
| 532066 ||  || — || March 14, 2013 || Kitt Peak || Spacewatch ||  || align=right | 1.4 km || 
|-id=067 bgcolor=#fefefe
| 532067 ||  || — || March 15, 2013 || Kitt Peak || Spacewatch ||  || align=right data-sort-value="0.64" | 640 m || 
|-id=068 bgcolor=#fefefe
| 532068 ||  || — || October 24, 2011 || Haleakala || Pan-STARRS ||  || align=right data-sort-value="0.69" | 690 m || 
|-id=069 bgcolor=#d6d6d6
| 532069 ||  || — || April 3, 2013 || Mount Lemmon || Mount Lemmon Survey || (895) || align=right | 3.1 km || 
|-id=070 bgcolor=#d6d6d6
| 532070 ||  || — || December 27, 2006 || Catalina || CSS || EUP || align=right | 3.1 km || 
|-id=071 bgcolor=#fefefe
| 532071 ||  || — || February 27, 2009 || Kitt Peak || Spacewatch || NYS || align=right data-sort-value="0.63" | 630 m || 
|-id=072 bgcolor=#fefefe
| 532072 ||  || — || November 25, 2011 || Haleakala || Pan-STARRS ||  || align=right data-sort-value="0.84" | 840 m || 
|-id=073 bgcolor=#fefefe
| 532073 ||  || — || December 19, 2004 || Mount Lemmon || Mount Lemmon Survey ||  || align=right data-sort-value="0.75" | 750 m || 
|-id=074 bgcolor=#fefefe
| 532074 ||  || — || November 30, 2008 || Kitt Peak || Spacewatch ||  || align=right data-sort-value="0.49" | 490 m || 
|-id=075 bgcolor=#fefefe
| 532075 ||  || — || December 16, 2007 || Kitt Peak || Spacewatch ||  || align=right data-sort-value="0.72" | 720 m || 
|-id=076 bgcolor=#fefefe
| 532076 ||  || — || September 27, 2003 || Kitt Peak || Spacewatch ||  || align=right data-sort-value="0.64" | 640 m || 
|-id=077 bgcolor=#fefefe
| 532077 ||  || — || April 9, 2013 || Haleakala || Pan-STARRS ||  || align=right data-sort-value="0.57" | 570 m || 
|-id=078 bgcolor=#d6d6d6
| 532078 ||  || — || April 9, 2013 || Haleakala || Pan-STARRS ||  || align=right | 2.5 km || 
|-id=079 bgcolor=#fefefe
| 532079 ||  || — || March 22, 2009 || Mount Lemmon || Mount Lemmon Survey ||  || align=right data-sort-value="0.65" | 650 m || 
|-id=080 bgcolor=#fefefe
| 532080 ||  || — || April 3, 2013 || Mount Lemmon || Mount Lemmon Survey ||  || align=right data-sort-value="0.64" | 640 m || 
|-id=081 bgcolor=#fefefe
| 532081 ||  || — || April 9, 2013 || Haleakala || Pan-STARRS ||  || align=right data-sort-value="0.52" | 520 m || 
|-id=082 bgcolor=#fefefe
| 532082 ||  || — || October 25, 2011 || Haleakala || Pan-STARRS ||  || align=right data-sort-value="0.60" | 600 m || 
|-id=083 bgcolor=#fefefe
| 532083 ||  || — || March 2, 2006 || Kitt Peak || Spacewatch ||  || align=right data-sort-value="0.40" | 400 m || 
|-id=084 bgcolor=#fefefe
| 532084 ||  || — || October 10, 2004 || Kitt Peak || Spacewatch ||  || align=right data-sort-value="0.54" | 540 m || 
|-id=085 bgcolor=#E9E9E9
| 532085 ||  || — || January 16, 2013 || Haleakala || Pan-STARRS ||  || align=right | 1.1 km || 
|-id=086 bgcolor=#fefefe
| 532086 ||  || — || April 10, 2013 || Haleakala || Pan-STARRS ||  || align=right data-sort-value="0.60" | 600 m || 
|-id=087 bgcolor=#fefefe
| 532087 ||  || — || January 23, 2006 || Kitt Peak || Spacewatch ||  || align=right data-sort-value="0.50" | 500 m || 
|-id=088 bgcolor=#fefefe
| 532088 ||  || — || April 10, 2013 || Haleakala || Pan-STARRS ||  || align=right data-sort-value="0.70" | 700 m || 
|-id=089 bgcolor=#fefefe
| 532089 ||  || — || October 4, 2007 || Mount Lemmon || Mount Lemmon Survey ||  || align=right data-sort-value="0.49" | 490 m || 
|-id=090 bgcolor=#fefefe
| 532090 ||  || — || September 18, 2003 || Kitt Peak || Spacewatch || NYS || align=right data-sort-value="0.58" | 580 m || 
|-id=091 bgcolor=#fefefe
| 532091 ||  || — || October 7, 2004 || Kitt Peak || Spacewatch ||  || align=right data-sort-value="0.56" | 560 m || 
|-id=092 bgcolor=#C2E0FF
| 532092 ||  || — || April 30, 2011 || Haleakala || Pan-STARRS || plutino || align=right | 346 km || 
|-id=093 bgcolor=#C2E0FF
| 532093 ||  || — || June 4, 2010 || Haleakala || Pan-STARRS || other TNOcritical || align=right | 391 km || 
|-id=094 bgcolor=#C7FF8F
| 532094 ||  || — || April 15, 2012 || Haleakala || Pan-STARRS || centaurcritical || align=right | 104 km || 
|-id=095 bgcolor=#C2E0FF
| 532095 ||  || — || April 17, 2013 || Haleakala || Pan-STARRS || other TNOcritical || align=right | 186 km || 
|-id=096 bgcolor=#fefefe
| 532096 ||  || — || March 19, 2009 || Mount Lemmon || Mount Lemmon Survey ||  || align=right data-sort-value="0.79" | 790 m || 
|-id=097 bgcolor=#E9E9E9
| 532097 ||  || — || April 21, 2013 || Haleakala || Pan-STARRS ||  || align=right | 1.7 km || 
|-id=098 bgcolor=#fefefe
| 532098 ||  || — || October 21, 2007 || Mount Lemmon || Mount Lemmon Survey ||  || align=right data-sort-value="0.87" | 870 m || 
|-id=099 bgcolor=#fefefe
| 532099 ||  || — || April 19, 2013 || Haleakala || Pan-STARRS ||  || align=right data-sort-value="0.63" | 630 m || 
|-id=100 bgcolor=#fefefe
| 532100 ||  || — || April 12, 2013 || Haleakala || Pan-STARRS ||  || align=right data-sort-value="0.80" | 800 m || 
|}

532101–532200 

|-bgcolor=#fefefe
| 532101 ||  || — || November 25, 2011 || Haleakala || Pan-STARRS ||  || align=right data-sort-value="0.84" | 840 m || 
|-id=102 bgcolor=#fefefe
| 532102 ||  || — || April 23, 2010 || WISE || WISE ||  || align=right | 1.0 km || 
|-id=103 bgcolor=#fefefe
| 532103 ||  || — || June 1, 2010 || WISE || WISE ||  || align=right | 1.9 km || 
|-id=104 bgcolor=#E9E9E9
| 532104 ||  || — || June 12, 2009 || Kitt Peak || Spacewatch ||  || align=right data-sort-value="0.88" | 880 m || 
|-id=105 bgcolor=#d6d6d6
| 532105 ||  || — || May 25, 2007 || Mount Lemmon || Mount Lemmon Survey || 7:4 || align=right | 2.0 km || 
|-id=106 bgcolor=#fefefe
| 532106 ||  || — || October 22, 2011 || Kitt Peak || Spacewatch ||  || align=right data-sort-value="0.87" | 870 m || 
|-id=107 bgcolor=#fefefe
| 532107 ||  || — || April 15, 2013 || Haleakala || Pan-STARRS ||  || align=right data-sort-value="0.91" | 910 m || 
|-id=108 bgcolor=#E9E9E9
| 532108 ||  || — || May 15, 2013 || Haleakala || Pan-STARRS ||  || align=right data-sort-value="0.77" | 770 m || 
|-id=109 bgcolor=#E9E9E9
| 532109 ||  || — || February 12, 2008 || Mount Lemmon || Mount Lemmon Survey ||  || align=right | 1.0 km || 
|-id=110 bgcolor=#E9E9E9
| 532110 ||  || — || May 15, 2013 || Haleakala || Pan-STARRS ||  || align=right data-sort-value="0.76" | 760 m || 
|-id=111 bgcolor=#fefefe
| 532111 ||  || — || April 23, 2013 || Mount Lemmon || Mount Lemmon Survey ||  || align=right | 1.1 km || 
|-id=112 bgcolor=#FA8072
| 532112 ||  || — || June 26, 2011 || Socorro || LINEAR ||  || align=right data-sort-value="0.58" | 580 m || 
|-id=113 bgcolor=#E9E9E9
| 532113 ||  || — || October 1, 2005 || Kitt Peak || Spacewatch || JUN || align=right data-sort-value="0.98" | 980 m || 
|-id=114 bgcolor=#E9E9E9
| 532114 ||  || — || May 8, 2013 || Haleakala || Pan-STARRS ||  || align=right data-sort-value="0.86" | 860 m || 
|-id=115 bgcolor=#fefefe
| 532115 ||  || — || July 12, 2010 || WISE || WISE ||  || align=right data-sort-value="0.98" | 980 m || 
|-id=116 bgcolor=#fefefe
| 532116 ||  || — || May 16, 2013 || Haleakala || Pan-STARRS ||  || align=right data-sort-value="0.76" | 760 m || 
|-id=117 bgcolor=#E9E9E9
| 532117 ||  || — || May 10, 2013 || Kitt Peak || Spacewatch ||  || align=right | 1.4 km || 
|-id=118 bgcolor=#fefefe
| 532118 ||  || — || May 15, 2013 || Haleakala || Pan-STARRS ||  || align=right data-sort-value="0.84" | 840 m || 
|-id=119 bgcolor=#fefefe
| 532119 ||  || — || June 5, 2013 || Mount Lemmon || Mount Lemmon Survey ||  || align=right data-sort-value="0.89" | 890 m || 
|-id=120 bgcolor=#E9E9E9
| 532120 ||  || — || May 20, 2013 || Haleakala || Pan-STARRS || JUN || align=right | 1.2 km || 
|-id=121 bgcolor=#E9E9E9
| 532121 ||  || — || June 1, 2013 || Mount Lemmon || Mount Lemmon Survey ||  || align=right | 1.4 km || 
|-id=122 bgcolor=#E9E9E9
| 532122 ||  || — || August 7, 2004 || Campo Imperatore || CINEOS ||  || align=right | 2.4 km || 
|-id=123 bgcolor=#E9E9E9
| 532123 ||  || — || June 7, 2013 || Mount Lemmon || Mount Lemmon Survey ||  || align=right | 1.4 km || 
|-id=124 bgcolor=#E9E9E9
| 532124 ||  || — || April 28, 2012 || Mount Lemmon || Mount Lemmon Survey ||  || align=right | 1.9 km || 
|-id=125 bgcolor=#fefefe
| 532125 ||  || — || June 11, 2013 || Mount Lemmon || Mount Lemmon Survey ||  || align=right data-sort-value="0.61" | 610 m || 
|-id=126 bgcolor=#E9E9E9
| 532126 ||  || — || April 4, 2012 || Haleakala || Pan-STARRS ||  || align=right | 3.5 km || 
|-id=127 bgcolor=#d6d6d6
| 532127 ||  || — || December 17, 2009 || Mount Lemmon || Mount Lemmon Survey ||  || align=right | 2.2 km || 
|-id=128 bgcolor=#E9E9E9
| 532128 ||  || — || June 19, 2013 || Mount Lemmon || Mount Lemmon Survey || DOR || align=right | 2.2 km || 
|-id=129 bgcolor=#E9E9E9
| 532129 ||  || — || June 19, 2013 || Haleakala || Pan-STARRS ||  || align=right | 1.7 km || 
|-id=130 bgcolor=#E9E9E9
| 532130 ||  || — || May 20, 2013 || Haleakala || Pan-STARRS ||  || align=right | 1.8 km || 
|-id=131 bgcolor=#E9E9E9
| 532131 ||  || — || October 5, 2005 || Mount Lemmon || Mount Lemmon Survey ||  || align=right | 1.1 km || 
|-id=132 bgcolor=#E9E9E9
| 532132 ||  || — || December 1, 2010 || Mount Lemmon || Mount Lemmon Survey ||  || align=right data-sort-value="0.86" | 860 m || 
|-id=133 bgcolor=#fefefe
| 532133 ||  || — || March 3, 2009 || Kitt Peak || Spacewatch ||  || align=right data-sort-value="0.64" | 640 m || 
|-id=134 bgcolor=#E9E9E9
| 532134 ||  || — || June 20, 2013 || Haleakala || Pan-STARRS ||  || align=right | 1.4 km || 
|-id=135 bgcolor=#E9E9E9
| 532135 ||  || — || January 12, 2011 || Mount Lemmon || Mount Lemmon Survey ||  || align=right | 1.4 km || 
|-id=136 bgcolor=#E9E9E9
| 532136 ||  || — || February 16, 2012 || Haleakala || Pan-STARRS ||  || align=right data-sort-value="0.84" | 840 m || 
|-id=137 bgcolor=#E9E9E9
| 532137 ||  || — || February 27, 2012 || Haleakala || Pan-STARRS ||  || align=right data-sort-value="0.89" | 890 m || 
|-id=138 bgcolor=#fefefe
| 532138 ||  || — || December 10, 2010 || Mount Lemmon || Mount Lemmon Survey ||  || align=right data-sort-value="0.80" | 800 m || 
|-id=139 bgcolor=#E9E9E9
| 532139 ||  || — || January 30, 2011 || Haleakala || Pan-STARRS ||  || align=right | 1.9 km || 
|-id=140 bgcolor=#E9E9E9
| 532140 ||  || — || March 11, 2008 || Kitt Peak || Spacewatch ||  || align=right | 1.2 km || 
|-id=141 bgcolor=#fefefe
| 532141 ||  || — || June 18, 2013 || Haleakala || Pan-STARRS ||  || align=right data-sort-value="0.65" | 650 m || 
|-id=142 bgcolor=#E9E9E9
| 532142 ||  || — || June 19, 2013 || Mount Lemmon || Mount Lemmon Survey ||  || align=right | 1.4 km || 
|-id=143 bgcolor=#fefefe
| 532143 ||  || — || June 16, 2013 || Haleakala || Pan-STARRS ||  || align=right data-sort-value="0.79" | 790 m || 
|-id=144 bgcolor=#fefefe
| 532144 ||  || — || June 30, 2013 || Haleakala || Pan-STARRS ||  || align=right data-sort-value="0.66" | 660 m || 
|-id=145 bgcolor=#E9E9E9
| 532145 ||  || — || May 31, 2013 || Haleakala || Pan-STARRS ||  || align=right | 1.2 km || 
|-id=146 bgcolor=#E9E9E9
| 532146 ||  || — || August 25, 1995 || Kitt Peak || Spacewatch ||  || align=right | 2.1 km || 
|-id=147 bgcolor=#fefefe
| 532147 ||  || — || February 9, 2005 || Mount Lemmon || Mount Lemmon Survey ||  || align=right data-sort-value="0.69" | 690 m || 
|-id=148 bgcolor=#E9E9E9
| 532148 ||  || — || July 1, 2013 || Haleakala || Pan-STARRS ||  || align=right | 1.1 km || 
|-id=149 bgcolor=#d6d6d6
| 532149 ||  || — || July 14, 2013 || Haleakala || Pan-STARRS ||  || align=right | 2.8 km || 
|-id=150 bgcolor=#E9E9E9
| 532150 ||  || — || March 5, 2011 || Mount Lemmon || Mount Lemmon Survey ||  || align=right | 1.0 km || 
|-id=151 bgcolor=#fefefe
| 532151 ||  || — || July 15, 2013 || Haleakala || Pan-STARRS ||  || align=right data-sort-value="0.58" | 580 m || 
|-id=152 bgcolor=#E9E9E9
| 532152 ||  || — || November 4, 2005 || Mount Lemmon || Mount Lemmon Survey ||  || align=right | 1.6 km || 
|-id=153 bgcolor=#E9E9E9
| 532153 ||  || — || February 21, 2012 || Kitt Peak || Spacewatch ||  || align=right | 1.0 km || 
|-id=154 bgcolor=#E9E9E9
| 532154 ||  || — || September 22, 2009 || Catalina || CSS ||  || align=right | 1.9 km || 
|-id=155 bgcolor=#E9E9E9
| 532155 ||  || — || July 14, 2013 || Haleakala || Pan-STARRS ||  || align=right | 1.4 km || 
|-id=156 bgcolor=#E9E9E9
| 532156 ||  || — || April 20, 2012 || Mount Lemmon || Mount Lemmon Survey ||  || align=right | 2.5 km || 
|-id=157 bgcolor=#E9E9E9
| 532157 ||  || — || September 13, 2005 || Kitt Peak || Spacewatch ||  || align=right data-sort-value="0.85" | 850 m || 
|-id=158 bgcolor=#E9E9E9
| 532158 ||  || — || November 4, 2005 || Kitt Peak || Spacewatch ||  || align=right | 1.3 km || 
|-id=159 bgcolor=#fefefe
| 532159 ||  || — || September 18, 2010 || Mount Lemmon || Mount Lemmon Survey ||  || align=right data-sort-value="0.63" | 630 m || 
|-id=160 bgcolor=#E9E9E9
| 532160 ||  || — || July 1, 2013 || Haleakala || Pan-STARRS ||  || align=right | 1.9 km || 
|-id=161 bgcolor=#d6d6d6
| 532161 ||  || — || July 2, 2013 || Haleakala || Pan-STARRS ||  || align=right | 2.2 km || 
|-id=162 bgcolor=#E9E9E9
| 532162 ||  || — || July 2, 2013 || Haleakala || Pan-STARRS ||  || align=right | 1.6 km || 
|-id=163 bgcolor=#E9E9E9
| 532163 ||  || — || July 14, 2013 || Haleakala || Pan-STARRS ||  || align=right data-sort-value="0.82" | 820 m || 
|-id=164 bgcolor=#E9E9E9
| 532164 ||  || — || January 8, 2011 || Mount Lemmon || Mount Lemmon Survey ||  || align=right | 1.1 km || 
|-id=165 bgcolor=#E9E9E9
| 532165 ||  || — || January 26, 2011 || Mount Lemmon || Mount Lemmon Survey ||  || align=right | 1.2 km || 
|-id=166 bgcolor=#E9E9E9
| 532166 ||  || — || March 14, 2007 || Kitt Peak || Spacewatch ||  || align=right | 1.8 km || 
|-id=167 bgcolor=#fefefe
| 532167 ||  || — || March 15, 2012 || Mount Lemmon || Mount Lemmon Survey ||  || align=right data-sort-value="0.67" | 670 m || 
|-id=168 bgcolor=#E9E9E9
| 532168 ||  || — || February 7, 2007 || Kitt Peak || Spacewatch ||  || align=right | 2.3 km || 
|-id=169 bgcolor=#E9E9E9
| 532169 ||  || — || September 30, 2009 || Mount Lemmon || Mount Lemmon Survey ||  || align=right | 1.7 km || 
|-id=170 bgcolor=#E9E9E9
| 532170 ||  || — || August 27, 2009 || Kitt Peak || Spacewatch ||  || align=right | 1.2 km || 
|-id=171 bgcolor=#E9E9E9
| 532171 ||  || — || July 15, 2013 || Haleakala || Pan-STARRS ||  || align=right | 1.4 km || 
|-id=172 bgcolor=#E9E9E9
| 532172 ||  || — || October 11, 2005 || Kitt Peak || Spacewatch ||  || align=right | 1.2 km || 
|-id=173 bgcolor=#E9E9E9
| 532173 ||  || — || February 21, 2007 || Kitt Peak || Spacewatch ||  || align=right | 1.2 km || 
|-id=174 bgcolor=#E9E9E9
| 532174 ||  || — || January 27, 2007 || Kitt Peak || Spacewatch ||  || align=right | 1.1 km || 
|-id=175 bgcolor=#E9E9E9
| 532175 ||  || — || July 1, 2013 || Haleakala || Pan-STARRS ||  || align=right | 2.7 km || 
|-id=176 bgcolor=#fefefe
| 532176 ||  || — || November 19, 2006 || Catalina || CSS ||  || align=right data-sort-value="0.96" | 960 m || 
|-id=177 bgcolor=#fefefe
| 532177 ||  || — || November 25, 2006 || Kitt Peak || Spacewatch ||  || align=right data-sort-value="0.76" | 760 m || 
|-id=178 bgcolor=#fefefe
| 532178 ||  || — || February 28, 2009 || Kitt Peak || Spacewatch ||  || align=right data-sort-value="0.68" | 680 m || 
|-id=179 bgcolor=#E9E9E9
| 532179 ||  || — || June 15, 2004 || Socorro || LINEAR ||  || align=right | 1.6 km || 
|-id=180 bgcolor=#E9E9E9
| 532180 ||  || — || July 14, 2013 || Haleakala || Pan-STARRS ||  || align=right | 1.6 km || 
|-id=181 bgcolor=#fefefe
| 532181 ||  || — || September 10, 2010 || Mount Lemmon || Mount Lemmon Survey ||  || align=right data-sort-value="0.71" | 710 m || 
|-id=182 bgcolor=#d6d6d6
| 532182 ||  || — || September 21, 2003 || Anderson Mesa || LONEOS ||  || align=right | 1.9 km || 
|-id=183 bgcolor=#E9E9E9
| 532183 ||  || — || October 2, 2009 || Mount Lemmon || Mount Lemmon Survey ||  || align=right | 2.0 km || 
|-id=184 bgcolor=#C2E0FF
| 532184 ||  || — || October 17, 2012 || Haleakala || Pan-STARRS || centaur || align=right | 154 km || 
|-id=185 bgcolor=#d6d6d6
| 532185 ||  || — || July 30, 2013 || La Sagra || OAM Obs. ||  || align=right | 2.7 km || 
|-id=186 bgcolor=#E9E9E9
| 532186 ||  || — || September 12, 2004 || Socorro || LINEAR ||  || align=right | 2.1 km || 
|-id=187 bgcolor=#E9E9E9
| 532187 ||  || — || September 11, 2004 || Socorro || LINEAR || 526 || align=right | 2.4 km || 
|-id=188 bgcolor=#d6d6d6
| 532188 ||  || — || August 7, 2008 || Kitt Peak || Spacewatch ||  || align=right | 2.0 km || 
|-id=189 bgcolor=#E9E9E9
| 532189 ||  || — || August 15, 2009 || Kitt Peak || Spacewatch ||  || align=right | 1.8 km || 
|-id=190 bgcolor=#E9E9E9
| 532190 ||  || — || September 28, 2000 || Socorro || LINEAR || JUN || align=right | 1.1 km || 
|-id=191 bgcolor=#fefefe
| 532191 ||  || — || November 4, 2007 || Kitt Peak || Spacewatch ||  || align=right data-sort-value="0.79" | 790 m || 
|-id=192 bgcolor=#E9E9E9
| 532192 ||  || — || January 30, 2011 || Haleakala || Pan-STARRS ||  || align=right | 1.8 km || 
|-id=193 bgcolor=#E9E9E9
| 532193 ||  || — || July 31, 2013 || La Sagra || OAM Obs. ||  || align=right | 1.8 km || 
|-id=194 bgcolor=#E9E9E9
| 532194 ||  || — || June 20, 2013 || Catalina || CSS ||  || align=right | 3.0 km || 
|-id=195 bgcolor=#E9E9E9
| 532195 ||  || — || January 14, 2011 || Mount Lemmon || Mount Lemmon Survey ||  || align=right | 1.5 km || 
|-id=196 bgcolor=#E9E9E9
| 532196 ||  || — || July 15, 2013 || Haleakala || Pan-STARRS ||  || align=right | 1.9 km || 
|-id=197 bgcolor=#fefefe
| 532197 ||  || — || July 14, 2013 || Haleakala || Pan-STARRS ||  || align=right data-sort-value="0.70" | 700 m || 
|-id=198 bgcolor=#E9E9E9
| 532198 ||  || — || February 28, 2012 || Haleakala || Pan-STARRS ||  || align=right | 1.5 km || 
|-id=199 bgcolor=#E9E9E9
| 532199 ||  || — || February 5, 2010 || WISE || WISE ||  || align=right | 2.0 km || 
|-id=200 bgcolor=#fefefe
| 532200 ||  || — || March 13, 2012 || Mount Lemmon || Mount Lemmon Survey ||  || align=right data-sort-value="0.60" | 600 m || 
|}

532201–532300 

|-bgcolor=#fefefe
| 532201 ||  || — || August 8, 2013 || Kitt Peak || Spacewatch ||  || align=right data-sort-value="0.68" | 680 m || 
|-id=202 bgcolor=#E9E9E9
| 532202 ||  || — || December 27, 2009 || Kitt Peak || Spacewatch ||  || align=right | 1.5 km || 
|-id=203 bgcolor=#E9E9E9
| 532203 ||  || — || December 16, 2009 || Mount Lemmon || Mount Lemmon Survey ||  || align=right | 2.4 km || 
|-id=204 bgcolor=#fefefe
| 532204 ||  || — || October 11, 2010 || Mount Lemmon || Mount Lemmon Survey ||  || align=right data-sort-value="0.54" | 540 m || 
|-id=205 bgcolor=#E9E9E9
| 532205 ||  || — || August 9, 2013 || Haleakala || Pan-STARRS ||  || align=right | 1.5 km || 
|-id=206 bgcolor=#E9E9E9
| 532206 ||  || — || August 9, 2013 || Haleakala || Pan-STARRS ||  || align=right | 1.2 km || 
|-id=207 bgcolor=#E9E9E9
| 532207 ||  || — || January 26, 2010 || WISE || WISE ||  || align=right | 1.9 km || 
|-id=208 bgcolor=#E9E9E9
| 532208 ||  || — || April 15, 2012 || Haleakala || Pan-STARRS ||  || align=right | 2.2 km || 
|-id=209 bgcolor=#E9E9E9
| 532209 ||  || — || August 7, 2013 || Kitt Peak || Spacewatch ||  || align=right | 1.2 km || 
|-id=210 bgcolor=#fefefe
| 532210 ||  || — || June 20, 2013 || Haleakala || Pan-STARRS ||  || align=right data-sort-value="0.52" | 520 m || 
|-id=211 bgcolor=#E9E9E9
| 532211 ||  || — || August 9, 2013 || Haleakala || Pan-STARRS ||  || align=right | 1.6 km || 
|-id=212 bgcolor=#E9E9E9
| 532212 ||  || — || June 20, 2013 || Haleakala || Pan-STARRS || GEF || align=right | 1.0 km || 
|-id=213 bgcolor=#E9E9E9
| 532213 ||  || — || June 20, 2013 || Haleakala || Pan-STARRS ||  || align=right | 1.8 km || 
|-id=214 bgcolor=#E9E9E9
| 532214 ||  || — || February 25, 2010 || WISE || WISE ||  || align=right | 2.0 km || 
|-id=215 bgcolor=#E9E9E9
| 532215 ||  || — || September 30, 2009 || Mount Lemmon || Mount Lemmon Survey ||  || align=right | 1.6 km || 
|-id=216 bgcolor=#FA8072
| 532216 ||  || — || July 15, 2013 || Haleakala || Pan-STARRS || H || align=right data-sort-value="0.43" | 430 m || 
|-id=217 bgcolor=#fefefe
| 532217 ||  || — || November 14, 2007 || Kitt Peak || Spacewatch ||  || align=right data-sort-value="0.61" | 610 m || 
|-id=218 bgcolor=#E9E9E9
| 532218 ||  || — || October 23, 2009 || Mount Lemmon || Mount Lemmon Survey ||  || align=right | 1.4 km || 
|-id=219 bgcolor=#E9E9E9
| 532219 ||  || — || September 5, 1999 || Anderson Mesa || LONEOS ||  || align=right | 2.1 km || 
|-id=220 bgcolor=#fefefe
| 532220 ||  || — || May 22, 2003 || Kitt Peak || Spacewatch ||  || align=right data-sort-value="0.54" | 540 m || 
|-id=221 bgcolor=#E9E9E9
| 532221 ||  || — || February 27, 2012 || Haleakala || Pan-STARRS ||  || align=right | 1.5 km || 
|-id=222 bgcolor=#E9E9E9
| 532222 ||  || — || April 15, 2012 || Haleakala || Pan-STARRS ||  || align=right | 2.3 km || 
|-id=223 bgcolor=#fefefe
| 532223 ||  || — || October 17, 2010 || Mount Lemmon || Mount Lemmon Survey ||  || align=right data-sort-value="0.59" | 590 m || 
|-id=224 bgcolor=#fefefe
| 532224 ||  || — || April 20, 2009 || Mount Lemmon || Mount Lemmon Survey ||  || align=right data-sort-value="0.64" | 640 m || 
|-id=225 bgcolor=#E9E9E9
| 532225 ||  || — || February 23, 2007 || Mount Lemmon || Mount Lemmon Survey ||  || align=right | 1.1 km || 
|-id=226 bgcolor=#E9E9E9
| 532226 ||  || — || September 18, 2009 || Catalina || CSS || JUN || align=right | 1.1 km || 
|-id=227 bgcolor=#E9E9E9
| 532227 ||  || — || November 21, 2009 || Catalina || CSS ||  || align=right | 1.5 km || 
|-id=228 bgcolor=#E9E9E9
| 532228 ||  || — || June 20, 2013 || Haleakala || Pan-STARRS ||  || align=right | 1.3 km || 
|-id=229 bgcolor=#E9E9E9
| 532229 ||  || — || January 22, 2006 || Mount Lemmon || Mount Lemmon Survey ||  || align=right | 1.9 km || 
|-id=230 bgcolor=#E9E9E9
| 532230 ||  || — || September 10, 2004 || Kitt Peak || Spacewatch ||  || align=right | 1.6 km || 
|-id=231 bgcolor=#E9E9E9
| 532231 ||  || — || November 1, 2005 || Kitt Peak || Spacewatch ||  || align=right | 1.1 km || 
|-id=232 bgcolor=#fefefe
| 532232 ||  || — || February 20, 2009 || Kitt Peak || Spacewatch ||  || align=right data-sort-value="0.61" | 610 m || 
|-id=233 bgcolor=#FA8072
| 532233 ||  || — || September 12, 2007 || Mount Lemmon || Mount Lemmon Survey ||  || align=right data-sort-value="0.38" | 380 m || 
|-id=234 bgcolor=#E9E9E9
| 532234 ||  || — || June 11, 2013 || Mount Lemmon || Mount Lemmon Survey ||  || align=right | 1.9 km || 
|-id=235 bgcolor=#E9E9E9
| 532235 ||  || — || February 25, 2011 || Mount Lemmon || Mount Lemmon Survey || AGN || align=right | 1.3 km || 
|-id=236 bgcolor=#E9E9E9
| 532236 ||  || — || October 23, 2005 || Catalina || CSS ||  || align=right data-sort-value="0.89" | 890 m || 
|-id=237 bgcolor=#E9E9E9
| 532237 ||  || — || February 13, 2011 || Mount Lemmon || Mount Lemmon Survey ||  || align=right | 1.1 km || 
|-id=238 bgcolor=#E9E9E9
| 532238 ||  || — || December 1, 2005 || Catalina || CSS ||  || align=right | 1.5 km || 
|-id=239 bgcolor=#E9E9E9
| 532239 ||  || — || January 23, 2006 || Mount Lemmon || Mount Lemmon Survey ||  || align=right | 1.9 km || 
|-id=240 bgcolor=#E9E9E9
| 532240 ||  || — || January 30, 2011 || Haleakala || Pan-STARRS ||  || align=right | 2.2 km || 
|-id=241 bgcolor=#E9E9E9
| 532241 ||  || — || August 12, 2013 || Haleakala || Pan-STARRS ||  || align=right | 1.7 km || 
|-id=242 bgcolor=#E9E9E9
| 532242 ||  || — || August 15, 2013 || Haleakala || Pan-STARRS ||  || align=right | 2.1 km || 
|-id=243 bgcolor=#E9E9E9
| 532243 ||  || — || January 30, 2011 || Haleakala || Pan-STARRS ||  || align=right | 1.8 km || 
|-id=244 bgcolor=#E9E9E9
| 532244 ||  || — || January 27, 2011 || Mount Lemmon || Mount Lemmon Survey ||  || align=right | 1.4 km || 
|-id=245 bgcolor=#E9E9E9
| 532245 ||  || — || February 23, 2007 || Mount Lemmon || Mount Lemmon Survey ||  || align=right | 1.5 km || 
|-id=246 bgcolor=#E9E9E9
| 532246 ||  || — || October 12, 2009 || Mount Lemmon || Mount Lemmon Survey ||  || align=right | 2.4 km || 
|-id=247 bgcolor=#fefefe
| 532247 ||  || — || August 15, 2013 || Haleakala || Pan-STARRS ||  || align=right data-sort-value="0.98" | 980 m || 
|-id=248 bgcolor=#E9E9E9
| 532248 ||  || — || October 24, 2009 || Kitt Peak || Spacewatch ||  || align=right | 1.9 km || 
|-id=249 bgcolor=#E9E9E9
| 532249 ||  || — || September 8, 2004 || Socorro || LINEAR ||  || align=right | 2.1 km || 
|-id=250 bgcolor=#fefefe
| 532250 ||  || — || November 25, 2010 || Mount Lemmon || Mount Lemmon Survey ||  || align=right data-sort-value="0.93" | 930 m || 
|-id=251 bgcolor=#E9E9E9
| 532251 ||  || — || August 12, 2013 || Kitt Peak || Spacewatch ||  || align=right | 1.9 km || 
|-id=252 bgcolor=#E9E9E9
| 532252 ||  || — || August 12, 2013 || Haleakala || Pan-STARRS ||  || align=right | 1.8 km || 
|-id=253 bgcolor=#E9E9E9
| 532253 ||  || — || August 15, 2013 || Haleakala || Pan-STARRS ||  || align=right | 2.3 km || 
|-id=254 bgcolor=#E9E9E9
| 532254 ||  || — || August 15, 2013 || Haleakala || Pan-STARRS ||  || align=right | 1.8 km || 
|-id=255 bgcolor=#E9E9E9
| 532255 ||  || — || February 7, 2011 || Mount Lemmon || Mount Lemmon Survey ||  || align=right | 1.4 km || 
|-id=256 bgcolor=#E9E9E9
| 532256 ||  || — || August 23, 2004 || Kitt Peak || Spacewatch ||  || align=right | 1.8 km || 
|-id=257 bgcolor=#E9E9E9
| 532257 ||  || — || August 7, 2013 || Kitt Peak || Spacewatch ||  || align=right | 1.2 km || 
|-id=258 bgcolor=#E9E9E9
| 532258 ||  || — || August 7, 2013 || Kitt Peak || Spacewatch ||  || align=right | 2.2 km || 
|-id=259 bgcolor=#fefefe
| 532259 ||  || — || March 16, 2012 || Mount Lemmon || Mount Lemmon Survey ||  || align=right data-sort-value="0.75" | 750 m || 
|-id=260 bgcolor=#fefefe
| 532260 ||  || — || August 12, 2013 || Kitt Peak || Spacewatch ||  || align=right data-sort-value="0.61" | 610 m || 
|-id=261 bgcolor=#E9E9E9
| 532261 ||  || — || January 28, 2011 || Mount Lemmon || Mount Lemmon Survey ||  || align=right | 1.8 km || 
|-id=262 bgcolor=#E9E9E9
| 532262 ||  || — || August 14, 2013 || Haleakala || Pan-STARRS ||  || align=right data-sort-value="0.76" | 760 m || 
|-id=263 bgcolor=#E9E9E9
| 532263 ||  || — || January 5, 2006 || Kitt Peak || Spacewatch ||  || align=right | 2.1 km || 
|-id=264 bgcolor=#E9E9E9
| 532264 ||  || — || August 15, 2013 || Haleakala || Pan-STARRS ||  || align=right | 1.1 km || 
|-id=265 bgcolor=#E9E9E9
| 532265 ||  || — || September 13, 2004 || Kitt Peak || Spacewatch ||  || align=right | 1.7 km || 
|-id=266 bgcolor=#E9E9E9
| 532266 ||  || — || August 15, 2013 || Haleakala || Pan-STARRS ||  || align=right data-sort-value="0.71" | 710 m || 
|-id=267 bgcolor=#d6d6d6
| 532267 ||  || — || August 15, 2013 || Haleakala || Pan-STARRS ||  || align=right | 1.8 km || 
|-id=268 bgcolor=#E9E9E9
| 532268 ||  || — || August 15, 2013 || Haleakala || Pan-STARRS ||  || align=right | 1.7 km || 
|-id=269 bgcolor=#E9E9E9
| 532269 ||  || — || September 13, 2004 || Kitt Peak || Spacewatch ||  || align=right | 2.1 km || 
|-id=270 bgcolor=#E9E9E9
| 532270 ||  || — || August 15, 2013 || Haleakala || Pan-STARRS ||  || align=right | 2.1 km || 
|-id=271 bgcolor=#fefefe
| 532271 ||  || — || August 3, 2013 || Haleakala || Pan-STARRS ||  || align=right data-sort-value="0.78" | 780 m || 
|-id=272 bgcolor=#E9E9E9
| 532272 ||  || — || September 21, 2009 || Catalina || CSS ||  || align=right | 1.3 km || 
|-id=273 bgcolor=#E9E9E9
| 532273 ||  || — || February 27, 2012 || Haleakala || Pan-STARRS ||  || align=right | 1.6 km || 
|-id=274 bgcolor=#fefefe
| 532274 ||  || — || October 17, 2010 || Mount Lemmon || Mount Lemmon Survey ||  || align=right data-sort-value="0.47" | 470 m || 
|-id=275 bgcolor=#E9E9E9
| 532275 ||  || — || September 15, 2009 || Kitt Peak || Spacewatch ||  || align=right | 1.2 km || 
|-id=276 bgcolor=#E9E9E9
| 532276 ||  || — || August 15, 2013 || Haleakala || Pan-STARRS ||  || align=right | 1.6 km || 
|-id=277 bgcolor=#E9E9E9
| 532277 ||  || — || February 27, 2012 || Haleakala || Pan-STARRS || EUN || align=right | 1.2 km || 
|-id=278 bgcolor=#fefefe
| 532278 ||  || — || November 10, 2010 || Mount Lemmon || Mount Lemmon Survey ||  || align=right data-sort-value="0.62" | 620 m || 
|-id=279 bgcolor=#d6d6d6
| 532279 ||  || — || October 2, 2006 || Mount Lemmon || Mount Lemmon Survey || 3:2 || align=right | 4.0 km || 
|-id=280 bgcolor=#E9E9E9
| 532280 ||  || — || April 13, 2012 || Haleakala || Pan-STARRS ||  || align=right | 1.3 km || 
|-id=281 bgcolor=#FA8072
| 532281 ||  || — || July 30, 2013 || Kitt Peak || Spacewatch ||  || align=right data-sort-value="0.65" | 650 m || 
|-id=282 bgcolor=#fefefe
| 532282 ||  || — || February 23, 2012 || Mount Lemmon || Mount Lemmon Survey ||  || align=right | 1.1 km || 
|-id=283 bgcolor=#E9E9E9
| 532283 ||  || — || August 30, 2013 || Haleakala || Pan-STARRS ||  || align=right | 1.1 km || 
|-id=284 bgcolor=#E9E9E9
| 532284 ||  || — || August 9, 2013 || Kitt Peak || Spacewatch ||  || align=right | 1.8 km || 
|-id=285 bgcolor=#E9E9E9
| 532285 ||  || — || August 20, 2004 || Socorro || LINEAR ||  || align=right | 2.4 km || 
|-id=286 bgcolor=#d6d6d6
| 532286 ||  || — || June 30, 2008 || Kitt Peak || Spacewatch ||  || align=right | 2.0 km || 
|-id=287 bgcolor=#E9E9E9
| 532287 ||  || — || November 21, 2009 || Kitt Peak || Spacewatch ||  || align=right | 1.4 km || 
|-id=288 bgcolor=#fefefe
| 532288 ||  || — || August 1, 2013 || Haleakala || Pan-STARRS ||  || align=right data-sort-value="0.56" | 560 m || 
|-id=289 bgcolor=#fefefe
| 532289 ||  || — || August 28, 2013 || Mount Lemmon || Mount Lemmon Survey ||  || align=right data-sort-value="0.94" | 940 m || 
|-id=290 bgcolor=#fefefe
| 532290 ||  || — || August 18, 2013 || Haleakala || Pan-STARRS ||  || align=right data-sort-value="0.71" | 710 m || 
|-id=291 bgcolor=#fefefe
| 532291 ||  || — || August 29, 2006 || Kitt Peak || Spacewatch ||  || align=right data-sort-value="0.54" | 540 m || 
|-id=292 bgcolor=#E9E9E9
| 532292 ||  || — || September 11, 2004 || Kitt Peak || Spacewatch ||  || align=right | 1.6 km || 
|-id=293 bgcolor=#fefefe
| 532293 ||  || — || April 5, 2010 || Kitt Peak || Spacewatch || H || align=right data-sort-value="0.55" | 550 m || 
|-id=294 bgcolor=#E9E9E9
| 532294 ||  || — || August 15, 2013 || Haleakala || Pan-STARRS ||  || align=right | 1.1 km || 
|-id=295 bgcolor=#E9E9E9
| 532295 ||  || — || September 20, 2009 || Kitt Peak || Spacewatch ||  || align=right | 1.2 km || 
|-id=296 bgcolor=#d6d6d6
| 532296 ||  || — || August 9, 2013 || Catalina || CSS ||  || align=right | 1.9 km || 
|-id=297 bgcolor=#E9E9E9
| 532297 ||  || — || August 14, 2013 || Haleakala || Pan-STARRS ||  || align=right | 2.1 km || 
|-id=298 bgcolor=#E9E9E9
| 532298 ||  || — || November 21, 2009 || Kitt Peak || Spacewatch ||  || align=right | 1.8 km || 
|-id=299 bgcolor=#E9E9E9
| 532299 ||  || — || August 26, 2013 || Haleakala || Pan-STARRS ||  || align=right data-sort-value="0.77" | 770 m || 
|-id=300 bgcolor=#d6d6d6
| 532300 ||  || — || August 31, 2008 || La Sagra || OAM Obs. ||  || align=right | 2.3 km || 
|}

532301–532400 

|-bgcolor=#E9E9E9
| 532301 ||  || — || July 15, 2013 || Haleakala || Pan-STARRS ||  || align=right | 1.6 km || 
|-id=302 bgcolor=#E9E9E9
| 532302 ||  || — || August 27, 2013 || Haleakala || Pan-STARRS ||  || align=right | 1.4 km || 
|-id=303 bgcolor=#E9E9E9
| 532303 ||  || — || August 27, 2013 || Haleakala || Pan-STARRS ||  || align=right | 2.8 km || 
|-id=304 bgcolor=#E9E9E9
| 532304 ||  || — || January 30, 2011 || Haleakala || Pan-STARRS ||  || align=right | 2.2 km || 
|-id=305 bgcolor=#E9E9E9
| 532305 ||  || — || September 7, 2004 || Kitt Peak || Spacewatch ||  || align=right | 1.8 km || 
|-id=306 bgcolor=#fefefe
| 532306 ||  || — || October 11, 2010 || Mount Lemmon || Mount Lemmon Survey ||  || align=right data-sort-value="0.57" | 570 m || 
|-id=307 bgcolor=#fefefe
| 532307 ||  || — || August 14, 2013 || Haleakala || Pan-STARRS ||  || align=right data-sort-value="0.74" | 740 m || 
|-id=308 bgcolor=#E9E9E9
| 532308 ||  || — || September 28, 2009 || Catalina || CSS ||  || align=right | 1.3 km || 
|-id=309 bgcolor=#fefefe
| 532309 ||  || — || June 20, 2013 || Haleakala || Pan-STARRS ||  || align=right data-sort-value="0.62" | 620 m || 
|-id=310 bgcolor=#fefefe
| 532310 ||  || — || April 24, 2006 || Kitt Peak || Spacewatch ||  || align=right data-sort-value="0.60" | 600 m || 
|-id=311 bgcolor=#fefefe
| 532311 ||  || — || April 25, 2006 || Kitt Peak || Spacewatch ||  || align=right data-sort-value="0.52" | 520 m || 
|-id=312 bgcolor=#fefefe
| 532312 ||  || — || January 10, 2011 || Mount Lemmon || Mount Lemmon Survey ||  || align=right data-sort-value="0.71" | 710 m || 
|-id=313 bgcolor=#E9E9E9
| 532313 ||  || — || August 31, 2013 || Haleakala || Pan-STARRS ||  || align=right | 2.6 km || 
|-id=314 bgcolor=#E9E9E9
| 532314 ||  || — || February 13, 2011 || Mount Lemmon || Mount Lemmon Survey ||  || align=right | 1.6 km || 
|-id=315 bgcolor=#E9E9E9
| 532315 ||  || — || September 17, 2004 || Kitt Peak || Spacewatch ||  || align=right | 1.7 km || 
|-id=316 bgcolor=#E9E9E9
| 532316 ||  || — || November 9, 2009 || Kitt Peak || Spacewatch ||  || align=right | 1.8 km || 
|-id=317 bgcolor=#d6d6d6
| 532317 ||  || — || February 7, 2011 || Mount Lemmon || Mount Lemmon Survey ||  || align=right | 2.2 km || 
|-id=318 bgcolor=#E9E9E9
| 532318 ||  || — || February 8, 2011 || Mount Lemmon || Mount Lemmon Survey ||  || align=right | 1.9 km || 
|-id=319 bgcolor=#E9E9E9
| 532319 ||  || — || August 28, 2013 || Mount Lemmon || Mount Lemmon Survey ||  || align=right data-sort-value="0.74" | 740 m || 
|-id=320 bgcolor=#fefefe
| 532320 ||  || — || September 30, 2003 || Kitt Peak || Spacewatch ||  || align=right data-sort-value="0.67" | 670 m || 
|-id=321 bgcolor=#d6d6d6
| 532321 ||  || — || March 31, 2011 || Haleakala || Pan-STARRS ||  || align=right | 1.9 km || 
|-id=322 bgcolor=#d6d6d6
| 532322 ||  || — || September 1, 2013 || Haleakala || Pan-STARRS ||  || align=right | 2.2 km || 
|-id=323 bgcolor=#d6d6d6
| 532323 ||  || — || September 6, 2008 || Mount Lemmon || Mount Lemmon Survey ||  || align=right | 1.8 km || 
|-id=324 bgcolor=#E9E9E9
| 532324 ||  || — || September 1, 2013 || Mount Lemmon || Mount Lemmon Survey ||  || align=right | 1.9 km || 
|-id=325 bgcolor=#E9E9E9
| 532325 ||  || — || September 2, 2013 || Catalina || CSS ||  || align=right | 2.2 km || 
|-id=326 bgcolor=#E9E9E9
| 532326 ||  || — || September 13, 2004 || Anderson Mesa || LONEOS ||  || align=right | 1.9 km || 
|-id=327 bgcolor=#fefefe
| 532327 ||  || — || June 1, 2000 || Kitt Peak || Spacewatch ||  || align=right data-sort-value="0.46" | 460 m || 
|-id=328 bgcolor=#E9E9E9
| 532328 ||  || — || August 17, 2013 || Haleakala || Pan-STARRS ||  || align=right | 2.0 km || 
|-id=329 bgcolor=#E9E9E9
| 532329 ||  || — || August 15, 2013 || Haleakala || Pan-STARRS ||  || align=right | 1.9 km || 
|-id=330 bgcolor=#E9E9E9
| 532330 ||  || — || August 12, 2013 || Haleakala || Pan-STARRS ||  || align=right | 1.2 km || 
|-id=331 bgcolor=#E9E9E9
| 532331 ||  || — || November 10, 2009 || Catalina || CSS ||  || align=right | 1.3 km || 
|-id=332 bgcolor=#E9E9E9
| 532332 ||  || — || February 7, 2010 || WISE || WISE ||  || align=right | 2.1 km || 
|-id=333 bgcolor=#fefefe
| 532333 ||  || — || October 3, 2006 || Mount Lemmon || Mount Lemmon Survey || ERI || align=right | 1.2 km || 
|-id=334 bgcolor=#E9E9E9
| 532334 ||  || — || August 8, 2004 || Socorro || LINEAR ||  || align=right | 1.4 km || 
|-id=335 bgcolor=#E9E9E9
| 532335 ||  || — || September 24, 2000 || Socorro || LINEAR || JUN || align=right | 1.0 km || 
|-id=336 bgcolor=#E9E9E9
| 532336 ||  || — || May 1, 2012 || Mount Lemmon || Mount Lemmon Survey || MRX || align=right | 1.1 km || 
|-id=337 bgcolor=#fefefe
| 532337 ||  || — || March 16, 2012 || Mount Lemmon || Mount Lemmon Survey ||  || align=right data-sort-value="0.85" | 850 m || 
|-id=338 bgcolor=#E9E9E9
| 532338 ||  || — || March 16, 2012 || Haleakala || Pan-STARRS ||  || align=right | 1.8 km || 
|-id=339 bgcolor=#fefefe
| 532339 ||  || — || March 28, 2008 || Mount Lemmon || Mount Lemmon Survey || V || align=right data-sort-value="0.59" | 590 m || 
|-id=340 bgcolor=#E9E9E9
| 532340 ||  || — || April 19, 2012 || Kitt Peak || Spacewatch ||  || align=right | 2.6 km || 
|-id=341 bgcolor=#E9E9E9
| 532341 ||  || — || September 5, 2013 || Kitt Peak || Spacewatch ||  || align=right | 1.7 km || 
|-id=342 bgcolor=#E9E9E9
| 532342 ||  || — || October 6, 2004 || Kitt Peak || Spacewatch ||  || align=right | 2.2 km || 
|-id=343 bgcolor=#fefefe
| 532343 ||  || — || April 1, 2009 || Mount Lemmon || Mount Lemmon Survey ||  || align=right data-sort-value="0.65" | 650 m || 
|-id=344 bgcolor=#E9E9E9
| 532344 ||  || — || November 9, 2009 || Socorro || LINEAR || EUN || align=right | 1.5 km || 
|-id=345 bgcolor=#E9E9E9
| 532345 ||  || — || September 4, 2013 || Mount Lemmon || Mount Lemmon Survey ||  || align=right | 1.7 km || 
|-id=346 bgcolor=#E9E9E9
| 532346 ||  || — || September 3, 2013 || Mount Lemmon || Mount Lemmon Survey ||  || align=right | 1.7 km || 
|-id=347 bgcolor=#E9E9E9
| 532347 ||  || — || September 5, 2013 || Kitt Peak || Spacewatch ||  || align=right | 2.5 km || 
|-id=348 bgcolor=#E9E9E9
| 532348 ||  || — || September 5, 2013 || Kitt Peak || Spacewatch ||  || align=right | 1.4 km || 
|-id=349 bgcolor=#fefefe
| 532349 ||  || — || September 5, 2013 || Kitt Peak || Spacewatch ||  || align=right data-sort-value="0.67" | 670 m || 
|-id=350 bgcolor=#fefefe
| 532350 ||  || — || September 9, 2013 || Haleakala || Pan-STARRS || H || align=right data-sort-value="0.68" | 680 m || 
|-id=351 bgcolor=#E9E9E9
| 532351 ||  || — || October 4, 2004 || Kitt Peak || Spacewatch ||  || align=right | 1.9 km || 
|-id=352 bgcolor=#fefefe
| 532352 ||  || — || November 27, 2006 || Mount Lemmon || Mount Lemmon Survey || NYS || align=right data-sort-value="0.78" | 780 m || 
|-id=353 bgcolor=#E9E9E9
| 532353 ||  || — || November 8, 2009 || Mount Lemmon || Mount Lemmon Survey ||  || align=right | 2.1 km || 
|-id=354 bgcolor=#d6d6d6
| 532354 ||  || — || February 13, 2010 || Mount Lemmon || Mount Lemmon Survey ||  || align=right | 2.2 km || 
|-id=355 bgcolor=#E9E9E9
| 532355 ||  || — || October 8, 2004 || Kitt Peak || Spacewatch || AGN || align=right | 1.1 km || 
|-id=356 bgcolor=#d6d6d6
| 532356 ||  || — || September 10, 2013 || Haleakala || Pan-STARRS ||  || align=right | 2.1 km || 
|-id=357 bgcolor=#E9E9E9
| 532357 ||  || — || February 4, 2011 || Haleakala || Pan-STARRS ||  || align=right | 2.2 km || 
|-id=358 bgcolor=#E9E9E9
| 532358 ||  || — || October 25, 2009 || Kitt Peak || Spacewatch ||  || align=right | 1.7 km || 
|-id=359 bgcolor=#FA8072
| 532359 ||  || — || November 9, 2000 || Socorro || LINEAR ||  || align=right | 1.7 km || 
|-id=360 bgcolor=#fefefe
| 532360 ||  || — || August 5, 2003 || Socorro || LINEAR ||  || align=right data-sort-value="0.80" | 800 m || 
|-id=361 bgcolor=#C2FFFF
| 532361 ||  || — || September 18, 2012 || Mount Lemmon || Mount Lemmon Survey || L5 || align=right | 8.4 km || 
|-id=362 bgcolor=#d6d6d6
| 532362 ||  || — || August 15, 2013 || Haleakala || Pan-STARRS ||  || align=right | 2.3 km || 
|-id=363 bgcolor=#E9E9E9
| 532363 ||  || — || August 17, 2013 || Haleakala || Pan-STARRS ||  || align=right | 1.2 km || 
|-id=364 bgcolor=#E9E9E9
| 532364 ||  || — || July 29, 2008 || La Sagra || OAM Obs. ||  || align=right | 2.0 km || 
|-id=365 bgcolor=#fefefe
| 532365 ||  || — || October 31, 2010 || Kitt Peak || Spacewatch ||  || align=right data-sort-value="0.59" | 590 m || 
|-id=366 bgcolor=#d6d6d6
| 532366 ||  || — || November 11, 1999 || Kitt Peak || Spacewatch ||  || align=right | 1.9 km || 
|-id=367 bgcolor=#fefefe
| 532367 ||  || — || August 15, 2013 || Haleakala || Pan-STARRS ||  || align=right data-sort-value="0.69" | 690 m || 
|-id=368 bgcolor=#E9E9E9
| 532368 ||  || — || September 1, 2013 || Mount Lemmon || Mount Lemmon Survey ||  || align=right | 1.7 km || 
|-id=369 bgcolor=#E9E9E9
| 532369 ||  || — || March 31, 2011 || Haleakala || Pan-STARRS ||  || align=right | 1.6 km || 
|-id=370 bgcolor=#d6d6d6
| 532370 ||  || — || October 12, 2002 || Socorro || LINEAR ||  || align=right | 3.3 km || 
|-id=371 bgcolor=#E9E9E9
| 532371 ||  || — || September 21, 2009 || Mount Lemmon || Mount Lemmon Survey ||  || align=right | 1.2 km || 
|-id=372 bgcolor=#d6d6d6
| 532372 ||  || — || September 7, 2008 || Mount Lemmon || Mount Lemmon Survey ||  || align=right | 1.7 km || 
|-id=373 bgcolor=#fefefe
| 532373 ||  || — || June 20, 2006 || Mount Lemmon || Mount Lemmon Survey ||  || align=right data-sort-value="0.68" | 680 m || 
|-id=374 bgcolor=#d6d6d6
| 532374 ||  || — || August 9, 2008 || La Sagra || OAM Obs. ||  || align=right | 2.5 km || 
|-id=375 bgcolor=#E9E9E9
| 532375 ||  || — || January 30, 2011 || Haleakala || Pan-STARRS || AST || align=right | 1.4 km || 
|-id=376 bgcolor=#E9E9E9
| 532376 ||  || — || September 3, 2013 || Haleakala || Pan-STARRS ||  || align=right | 1.6 km || 
|-id=377 bgcolor=#E9E9E9
| 532377 ||  || — || February 23, 2011 || Kitt Peak || Spacewatch ||  || align=right | 1.6 km || 
|-id=378 bgcolor=#E9E9E9
| 532378 ||  || — || October 8, 2004 || Kitt Peak || Spacewatch ||  || align=right | 1.8 km || 
|-id=379 bgcolor=#E9E9E9
| 532379 ||  || — || April 27, 2012 || Haleakala || Pan-STARRS ||  || align=right | 1.3 km || 
|-id=380 bgcolor=#fefefe
| 532380 ||  || — || September 8, 1996 || Kitt Peak || Spacewatch ||  || align=right data-sort-value="0.75" | 750 m || 
|-id=381 bgcolor=#fefefe
| 532381 ||  || — || September 13, 2013 || Kitt Peak || Spacewatch ||  || align=right data-sort-value="0.60" | 600 m || 
|-id=382 bgcolor=#d6d6d6
| 532382 ||  || — || October 10, 2008 || Mount Lemmon || Mount Lemmon Survey ||  || align=right | 2.0 km || 
|-id=383 bgcolor=#E9E9E9
| 532383 ||  || — || September 13, 2013 || Kitt Peak || Spacewatch ||  || align=right | 1.5 km || 
|-id=384 bgcolor=#E9E9E9
| 532384 ||  || — || February 22, 2006 || Catalina || CSS ||  || align=right | 1.6 km || 
|-id=385 bgcolor=#d6d6d6
| 532385 ||  || — || September 14, 2013 || Kitt Peak || Spacewatch ||  || align=right | 3.0 km || 
|-id=386 bgcolor=#E9E9E9
| 532386 ||  || — || September 6, 2013 || Kitt Peak || Spacewatch ||  || align=right | 2.1 km || 
|-id=387 bgcolor=#d6d6d6
| 532387 ||  || — || May 20, 2006 || Kitt Peak || Spacewatch ||  || align=right | 3.6 km || 
|-id=388 bgcolor=#E9E9E9
| 532388 ||  || — || August 3, 2008 || Siding Spring || SSS ||  || align=right | 2.2 km || 
|-id=389 bgcolor=#fefefe
| 532389 ||  || — || August 20, 2009 || La Sagra || OAM Obs. ||  || align=right data-sort-value="0.79" | 790 m || 
|-id=390 bgcolor=#E9E9E9
| 532390 ||  || — || October 7, 2004 || Kitt Peak || Spacewatch ||  || align=right | 1.5 km || 
|-id=391 bgcolor=#E9E9E9
| 532391 ||  || — || November 28, 2000 || Kitt Peak || Spacewatch ||  || align=right | 1.4 km || 
|-id=392 bgcolor=#d6d6d6
| 532392 ||  || — || September 6, 2013 || Kitt Peak || Spacewatch ||  || align=right | 2.5 km || 
|-id=393 bgcolor=#d6d6d6
| 532393 ||  || — || March 8, 2005 || Mount Lemmon || Mount Lemmon Survey ||  || align=right | 2.6 km || 
|-id=394 bgcolor=#E9E9E9
| 532394 ||  || — || January 8, 2006 || Mount Lemmon || Mount Lemmon Survey ||  || align=right | 1.7 km || 
|-id=395 bgcolor=#E9E9E9
| 532395 ||  || — || November 9, 2009 || Mount Lemmon || Mount Lemmon Survey ||  || align=right | 2.0 km || 
|-id=396 bgcolor=#fefefe
| 532396 ||  || — || September 28, 2009 || Kitt Peak || Spacewatch ||  || align=right data-sort-value="0.82" | 820 m || 
|-id=397 bgcolor=#E9E9E9
| 532397 ||  || — || September 21, 2009 || Mount Lemmon || Mount Lemmon Survey ||  || align=right | 2.2 km || 
|-id=398 bgcolor=#E9E9E9
| 532398 ||  || — || January 30, 2011 || Haleakala || Pan-STARRS ||  || align=right | 1.6 km || 
|-id=399 bgcolor=#d6d6d6
| 532399 ||  || — || January 28, 2009 || Catalina || CSS ||  || align=right | 4.0 km || 
|-id=400 bgcolor=#fefefe
| 532400 ||  || — || September 3, 2013 || Mount Lemmon || Mount Lemmon Survey ||  || align=right data-sort-value="0.70" | 700 m || 
|}

532401–532500 

|-bgcolor=#fefefe
| 532401 ||  || — || March 8, 2008 || Mount Lemmon || Mount Lemmon Survey ||  || align=right data-sort-value="0.79" | 790 m || 
|-id=402 bgcolor=#fefefe
| 532402 ||  || — || April 15, 2012 || Haleakala || Pan-STARRS ||  || align=right data-sort-value="0.83" | 830 m || 
|-id=403 bgcolor=#E9E9E9
| 532403 ||  || — || September 3, 2013 || Haleakala || Pan-STARRS ||  || align=right | 1.1 km || 
|-id=404 bgcolor=#E9E9E9
| 532404 ||  || — || September 9, 2013 || Haleakala || Pan-STARRS ||  || align=right | 1.0 km || 
|-id=405 bgcolor=#d6d6d6
| 532405 ||  || — || June 10, 2010 || WISE || WISE ||  || align=right | 2.2 km || 
|-id=406 bgcolor=#d6d6d6
| 532406 ||  || — || November 29, 1999 || Kitt Peak || Spacewatch ||  || align=right | 1.9 km || 
|-id=407 bgcolor=#E9E9E9
| 532407 ||  || — || September 6, 2013 || Kitt Peak || Spacewatch ||  || align=right | 2.0 km || 
|-id=408 bgcolor=#fefefe
| 532408 ||  || — || September 6, 2013 || Kitt Peak || Spacewatch ||  || align=right data-sort-value="0.82" | 820 m || 
|-id=409 bgcolor=#d6d6d6
| 532409 ||  || — || September 18, 2003 || Kitt Peak || Spacewatch ||  || align=right | 2.5 km || 
|-id=410 bgcolor=#d6d6d6
| 532410 ||  || — || April 16, 2005 || Kitt Peak || Spacewatch ||  || align=right | 3.7 km || 
|-id=411 bgcolor=#E9E9E9
| 532411 ||  || — || January 10, 2006 || Mount Lemmon || Mount Lemmon Survey ||  || align=right | 1.4 km || 
|-id=412 bgcolor=#E9E9E9
| 532412 ||  || — || September 1, 2013 || Mount Lemmon || Mount Lemmon Survey ||  || align=right | 1.5 km || 
|-id=413 bgcolor=#fefefe
| 532413 ||  || — || September 1, 2013 || Haleakala || Pan-STARRS ||  || align=right data-sort-value="0.60" | 600 m || 
|-id=414 bgcolor=#E9E9E9
| 532414 ||  || — || September 3, 2013 || Kitt Peak || Spacewatch ||  || align=right | 1.8 km || 
|-id=415 bgcolor=#fefefe
| 532415 ||  || — || September 3, 2013 || Kitt Peak || Spacewatch ||  || align=right data-sort-value="0.89" | 890 m || 
|-id=416 bgcolor=#E9E9E9
| 532416 ||  || — || September 6, 2013 || Mount Lemmon || Mount Lemmon Survey ||  || align=right | 1.9 km || 
|-id=417 bgcolor=#E9E9E9
| 532417 ||  || — || September 6, 2013 || Mount Lemmon || Mount Lemmon Survey ||  || align=right | 1.9 km || 
|-id=418 bgcolor=#fefefe
| 532418 ||  || — || September 9, 2013 || Haleakala || Pan-STARRS ||  || align=right data-sort-value="0.65" | 650 m || 
|-id=419 bgcolor=#E9E9E9
| 532419 ||  || — || November 10, 2009 || Kitt Peak || Spacewatch ||  || align=right | 2.1 km || 
|-id=420 bgcolor=#d6d6d6
| 532420 ||  || — || September 12, 2013 || Mount Lemmon || Mount Lemmon Survey ||  || align=right | 2.8 km || 
|-id=421 bgcolor=#d6d6d6
| 532421 ||  || — || September 14, 2013 || Mount Lemmon || Mount Lemmon Survey ||  || align=right | 3.4 km || 
|-id=422 bgcolor=#fefefe
| 532422 ||  || — || September 14, 2013 || Haleakala || Pan-STARRS ||  || align=right data-sort-value="0.61" | 610 m || 
|-id=423 bgcolor=#d6d6d6
| 532423 ||  || — || September 14, 2013 || Haleakala || Pan-STARRS ||  || align=right | 2.1 km || 
|-id=424 bgcolor=#E9E9E9
| 532424 ||  || — || September 14, 2013 || Haleakala || Pan-STARRS ||  || align=right | 1.6 km || 
|-id=425 bgcolor=#E9E9E9
| 532425 ||  || — || September 15, 2013 || Kitt Peak || Spacewatch ||  || align=right data-sort-value="0.77" | 770 m || 
|-id=426 bgcolor=#E9E9E9
| 532426 ||  || — || September 1, 2013 || Mount Lemmon || Mount Lemmon Survey ||  || align=right | 1.2 km || 
|-id=427 bgcolor=#E9E9E9
| 532427 ||  || — || September 3, 2013 || Mount Lemmon || Mount Lemmon Survey ||  || align=right | 1.8 km || 
|-id=428 bgcolor=#fefefe
| 532428 ||  || — || September 10, 2013 || Haleakala || Pan-STARRS ||  || align=right data-sort-value="0.67" | 670 m || 
|-id=429 bgcolor=#E9E9E9
| 532429 ||  || — || November 17, 2009 || Catalina || CSS ||  || align=right | 1.9 km || 
|-id=430 bgcolor=#FA8072
| 532430 ||  || — || July 25, 2010 || WISE || WISE ||  || align=right | 1.4 km || 
|-id=431 bgcolor=#E9E9E9
| 532431 ||  || — || November 9, 2009 || Mount Lemmon || Mount Lemmon Survey || NEM || align=right | 1.7 km || 
|-id=432 bgcolor=#E9E9E9
| 532432 ||  || — || November 19, 2009 || Mount Lemmon || Mount Lemmon Survey ||  || align=right | 1.1 km || 
|-id=433 bgcolor=#E9E9E9
| 532433 ||  || — || July 31, 2008 || La Sagra || OAM Obs. ||  || align=right | 2.4 km || 
|-id=434 bgcolor=#E9E9E9
| 532434 ||  || — || August 20, 2004 || Siding Spring || SSS ||  || align=right | 1.6 km || 
|-id=435 bgcolor=#d6d6d6
| 532435 ||  || — || August 27, 2013 || Haleakala || Pan-STARRS || 3:2 || align=right | 4.3 km || 
|-id=436 bgcolor=#E9E9E9
| 532436 ||  || — || September 5, 2013 || Kitt Peak || Spacewatch ||  || align=right | 1.3 km || 
|-id=437 bgcolor=#fefefe
| 532437 ||  || — || January 30, 2011 || Haleakala || Pan-STARRS ||  || align=right data-sort-value="0.77" | 770 m || 
|-id=438 bgcolor=#E9E9E9
| 532438 ||  || — || November 2, 2000 || Socorro || LINEAR ||  || align=right | 1.4 km || 
|-id=439 bgcolor=#E9E9E9
| 532439 ||  || — || March 19, 2010 || WISE || WISE ||  || align=right | 2.1 km || 
|-id=440 bgcolor=#E9E9E9
| 532440 ||  || — || September 9, 2013 || Haleakala || Pan-STARRS ||  || align=right | 1.8 km || 
|-id=441 bgcolor=#fefefe
| 532441 ||  || — || February 2, 2008 || Kitt Peak || Spacewatch ||  || align=right data-sort-value="0.80" | 800 m || 
|-id=442 bgcolor=#E9E9E9
| 532442 ||  || — || September 25, 2013 || Mount Lemmon || Mount Lemmon Survey ||  || align=right | 1.9 km || 
|-id=443 bgcolor=#fefefe
| 532443 ||  || — || February 26, 2009 || Kitt Peak || Spacewatch ||  || align=right data-sort-value="0.65" | 650 m || 
|-id=444 bgcolor=#E9E9E9
| 532444 ||  || — || November 6, 2005 || Anderson Mesa || LONEOS ||  || align=right data-sort-value="0.95" | 950 m || 
|-id=445 bgcolor=#E9E9E9
| 532445 ||  || — || March 12, 2007 || Kitt Peak || Spacewatch ||  || align=right | 1.5 km || 
|-id=446 bgcolor=#E9E9E9
| 532446 ||  || — || September 1, 2013 || Mount Lemmon || Mount Lemmon Survey ||  || align=right | 1.8 km || 
|-id=447 bgcolor=#E9E9E9
| 532447 ||  || — || January 30, 2011 || Haleakala || Pan-STARRS ||  || align=right | 2.1 km || 
|-id=448 bgcolor=#E9E9E9
| 532448 ||  || — || August 6, 2008 || La Sagra || OAM Obs. ||  || align=right | 2.7 km || 
|-id=449 bgcolor=#d6d6d6
| 532449 ||  || — || March 30, 2011 || Mount Lemmon || Mount Lemmon Survey || KOR || align=right | 1.2 km || 
|-id=450 bgcolor=#E9E9E9
| 532450 ||  || — || June 8, 2013 || Mount Lemmon || Mount Lemmon Survey ||  || align=right | 2.8 km || 
|-id=451 bgcolor=#fefefe
| 532451 ||  || — || September 18, 2006 || Kitt Peak || Spacewatch ||  || align=right data-sort-value="0.71" | 710 m || 
|-id=452 bgcolor=#E9E9E9
| 532452 ||  || — || September 16, 2004 || Kitt Peak || Spacewatch ||  || align=right | 1.7 km || 
|-id=453 bgcolor=#E9E9E9
| 532453 ||  || — || September 15, 2009 || Kitt Peak || Spacewatch ||  || align=right data-sort-value="0.80" | 800 m || 
|-id=454 bgcolor=#fefefe
| 532454 ||  || — || February 20, 2012 || Kitt Peak || Spacewatch ||  || align=right data-sort-value="0.96" | 960 m || 
|-id=455 bgcolor=#d6d6d6
| 532455 ||  || — || September 6, 2008 || Mount Lemmon || Mount Lemmon Survey || KOR || align=right | 1.3 km || 
|-id=456 bgcolor=#d6d6d6
| 532456 ||  || — || September 23, 2008 || Mount Lemmon || Mount Lemmon Survey ||  || align=right | 1.9 km || 
|-id=457 bgcolor=#fefefe
| 532457 ||  || — || September 28, 2013 || Haleakala || Pan-STARRS || H || align=right data-sort-value="0.56" | 560 m || 
|-id=458 bgcolor=#E9E9E9
| 532458 ||  || — || November 10, 2004 || Kitt Peak || Spacewatch ||  || align=right | 1.9 km || 
|-id=459 bgcolor=#fefefe
| 532459 ||  || — || October 24, 2008 || Kitt Peak || Spacewatch || H || align=right data-sort-value="0.69" | 690 m || 
|-id=460 bgcolor=#E9E9E9
| 532460 ||  || — || July 30, 2013 || Kitt Peak || Spacewatch ||  || align=right | 1.8 km || 
|-id=461 bgcolor=#fefefe
| 532461 ||  || — || September 5, 2013 || Kitt Peak || Spacewatch ||  || align=right data-sort-value="0.84" | 840 m || 
|-id=462 bgcolor=#fefefe
| 532462 ||  || — || August 15, 2013 || Haleakala || Pan-STARRS || V || align=right data-sort-value="0.57" | 570 m || 
|-id=463 bgcolor=#E9E9E9
| 532463 ||  || — || November 17, 2009 || Kitt Peak || Spacewatch ||  || align=right | 1.6 km || 
|-id=464 bgcolor=#d6d6d6
| 532464 ||  || — || October 27, 2008 || Mount Lemmon || Mount Lemmon Survey ||  || align=right | 2.0 km || 
|-id=465 bgcolor=#fefefe
| 532465 ||  || — || September 2, 2013 || Mount Lemmon || Mount Lemmon Survey ||  || align=right data-sort-value="0.72" | 720 m || 
|-id=466 bgcolor=#d6d6d6
| 532466 ||  || — || September 7, 2008 || Mount Lemmon || Mount Lemmon Survey ||  || align=right | 1.8 km || 
|-id=467 bgcolor=#E9E9E9
| 532467 ||  || — || September 3, 2013 || Mount Lemmon || Mount Lemmon Survey ||  || align=right | 1.9 km || 
|-id=468 bgcolor=#E9E9E9
| 532468 ||  || — || June 6, 1999 || Kitt Peak || Spacewatch ||  || align=right | 2.1 km || 
|-id=469 bgcolor=#E9E9E9
| 532469 ||  || — || October 7, 2004 || Kitt Peak || Spacewatch ||  || align=right | 1.7 km || 
|-id=470 bgcolor=#E9E9E9
| 532470 ||  || — || January 10, 2006 || Mount Lemmon || Mount Lemmon Survey || MIS || align=right | 1.8 km || 
|-id=471 bgcolor=#E9E9E9
| 532471 ||  || — || September 14, 2013 || Haleakala || Pan-STARRS ||  || align=right | 1.4 km || 
|-id=472 bgcolor=#E9E9E9
| 532472 ||  || — || October 14, 2009 || Mount Lemmon || Mount Lemmon Survey ||  || align=right | 1.2 km || 
|-id=473 bgcolor=#E9E9E9
| 532473 ||  || — || November 9, 2009 || Kitt Peak || Spacewatch ||  || align=right | 1.2 km || 
|-id=474 bgcolor=#E9E9E9
| 532474 ||  || — || August 8, 2004 || Socorro || LINEAR || JUN || align=right data-sort-value="0.95" | 950 m || 
|-id=475 bgcolor=#fefefe
| 532475 ||  || — || September 27, 2006 || Mount Lemmon || Mount Lemmon Survey || PHO || align=right data-sort-value="0.94" | 940 m || 
|-id=476 bgcolor=#E9E9E9
| 532476 ||  || — || January 30, 2011 || Haleakala || Pan-STARRS || HNS || align=right | 1.0 km || 
|-id=477 bgcolor=#d6d6d6
| 532477 ||  || — || May 24, 2010 || WISE || WISE ||  || align=right | 3.6 km || 
|-id=478 bgcolor=#E9E9E9
| 532478 ||  || — || December 18, 2009 || Mount Lemmon || Mount Lemmon Survey ||  || align=right | 1.7 km || 
|-id=479 bgcolor=#E9E9E9
| 532479 ||  || — || December 19, 2009 || Mount Lemmon || Mount Lemmon Survey ||  || align=right | 1.8 km || 
|-id=480 bgcolor=#E9E9E9
| 532480 ||  || — || February 4, 2010 || WISE || WISE ||  || align=right | 1.7 km || 
|-id=481 bgcolor=#E9E9E9
| 532481 ||  || — || August 25, 2012 || Kitt Peak || Spacewatch ||  || align=right | 3.3 km || 
|-id=482 bgcolor=#E9E9E9
| 532482 ||  || — || September 17, 2013 || Mount Lemmon || Mount Lemmon Survey ||  || align=right | 1.2 km || 
|-id=483 bgcolor=#E9E9E9
| 532483 ||  || — || September 25, 2013 || Mount Lemmon || Mount Lemmon Survey ||  || align=right | 1.2 km || 
|-id=484 bgcolor=#C2FFFF
| 532484 ||  || — || September 26, 2013 || Mount Lemmon || Mount Lemmon Survey || L5 || align=right | 6.6 km || 
|-id=485 bgcolor=#E9E9E9
| 532485 ||  || — || November 17, 2009 || Kitt Peak || Spacewatch ||  || align=right | 2.3 km || 
|-id=486 bgcolor=#FA8072
| 532486 ||  || — || April 11, 2005 || Mount Lemmon || Mount Lemmon Survey || H || align=right data-sort-value="0.43" | 430 m || 
|-id=487 bgcolor=#FA8072
| 532487 ||  || — || October 6, 2008 || Siding Spring || SSS || H || align=right data-sort-value="0.50" | 500 m || 
|-id=488 bgcolor=#E9E9E9
| 532488 ||  || — || December 9, 2004 || Catalina || CSS ||  || align=right | 2.5 km || 
|-id=489 bgcolor=#d6d6d6
| 532489 ||  || — || September 30, 2013 || XuYi || PMO NEO ||  || align=right | 2.5 km || 
|-id=490 bgcolor=#d6d6d6
| 532490 ||  || — || September 27, 2008 || Mount Lemmon || Mount Lemmon Survey ||  || align=right | 2.5 km || 
|-id=491 bgcolor=#fefefe
| 532491 ||  || — || November 3, 2010 || Kitt Peak || Spacewatch ||  || align=right data-sort-value="0.68" | 680 m || 
|-id=492 bgcolor=#E9E9E9
| 532492 ||  || — || January 10, 2010 || Mount Lemmon || Mount Lemmon Survey ||  || align=right | 1.8 km || 
|-id=493 bgcolor=#fefefe
| 532493 ||  || — || September 14, 2013 || Haleakala || Pan-STARRS ||  || align=right data-sort-value="0.77" | 770 m || 
|-id=494 bgcolor=#E9E9E9
| 532494 ||  || — || October 1, 2013 || Mount Lemmon || Mount Lemmon Survey ||  || align=right | 1.8 km || 
|-id=495 bgcolor=#E9E9E9
| 532495 ||  || — || November 8, 2009 || Mount Lemmon || Mount Lemmon Survey ||  || align=right data-sort-value="0.91" | 910 m || 
|-id=496 bgcolor=#E9E9E9
| 532496 ||  || — || April 2, 2010 || WISE || WISE ||  || align=right | 2.1 km || 
|-id=497 bgcolor=#E9E9E9
| 532497 ||  || — || September 29, 2013 || XuYi || PMO NEO ||  || align=right | 2.1 km || 
|-id=498 bgcolor=#E9E9E9
| 532498 ||  || — || September 14, 2013 || Mount Lemmon || Mount Lemmon Survey ||  || align=right | 2.6 km || 
|-id=499 bgcolor=#d6d6d6
| 532499 ||  || — || September 15, 2013 || Mount Lemmon || Mount Lemmon Survey ||  || align=right | 2.2 km || 
|-id=500 bgcolor=#E9E9E9
| 532500 ||  || — || October 6, 2004 || Kitt Peak || Spacewatch || PAD || align=right | 1.3 km || 
|}

532501–532600 

|-bgcolor=#d6d6d6
| 532501 ||  || — || September 20, 2008 || Mount Lemmon || Mount Lemmon Survey || KOR || align=right | 1.1 km || 
|-id=502 bgcolor=#E9E9E9
| 532502 ||  || — || September 6, 2013 || Catalina || CSS ||  || align=right | 1.2 km || 
|-id=503 bgcolor=#fefefe
| 532503 ||  || — || September 29, 2005 || Kitt Peak || Spacewatch || H || align=right data-sort-value="0.62" | 620 m || 
|-id=504 bgcolor=#E9E9E9
| 532504 ||  || — || April 14, 2010 || WISE || WISE ||  || align=right | 1.9 km || 
|-id=505 bgcolor=#d6d6d6
| 532505 ||  || — || September 1, 2013 || Catalina || CSS ||  || align=right | 3.4 km || 
|-id=506 bgcolor=#E9E9E9
| 532506 ||  || — || December 14, 2004 || Kitt Peak || Spacewatch ||  || align=right | 1.7 km || 
|-id=507 bgcolor=#d6d6d6
| 532507 ||  || — || September 28, 2008 || Catalina || CSS ||  || align=right | 2.1 km || 
|-id=508 bgcolor=#d6d6d6
| 532508 ||  || — || January 14, 2010 || WISE || WISE ||  || align=right | 3.0 km || 
|-id=509 bgcolor=#d6d6d6
| 532509 ||  || — || October 2, 2013 || Kitt Peak || Spacewatch ||  || align=right | 3.1 km || 
|-id=510 bgcolor=#E9E9E9
| 532510 ||  || — || October 2, 2013 || Mount Lemmon || Mount Lemmon Survey ||  || align=right | 2.0 km || 
|-id=511 bgcolor=#E9E9E9
| 532511 ||  || — || October 8, 2004 || Kitt Peak || Spacewatch ||  || align=right | 1.6 km || 
|-id=512 bgcolor=#E9E9E9
| 532512 ||  || — || September 9, 2004 || Socorro || LINEAR ||  || align=right | 2.1 km || 
|-id=513 bgcolor=#E9E9E9
| 532513 ||  || — || September 13, 2013 || Mount Lemmon || Mount Lemmon Survey || DOR || align=right | 2.3 km || 
|-id=514 bgcolor=#E9E9E9
| 532514 ||  || — || October 3, 2013 || Kitt Peak || Spacewatch ||  || align=right | 1.1 km || 
|-id=515 bgcolor=#E9E9E9
| 532515 ||  || — || September 16, 2013 || Catalina || CSS ||  || align=right | 1.9 km || 
|-id=516 bgcolor=#E9E9E9
| 532516 ||  || — || August 23, 2008 || Siding Spring || SSS ||  || align=right | 2.2 km || 
|-id=517 bgcolor=#d6d6d6
| 532517 ||  || — || July 20, 2013 || Haleakala || Pan-STARRS ||  || align=right | 4.0 km || 
|-id=518 bgcolor=#E9E9E9
| 532518 ||  || — || October 4, 2013 || Kitt Peak || Spacewatch ||  || align=right | 1.1 km || 
|-id=519 bgcolor=#d6d6d6
| 532519 ||  || — || October 22, 2008 || Kitt Peak || Spacewatch ||  || align=right | 2.2 km || 
|-id=520 bgcolor=#E9E9E9
| 532520 ||  || — || October 9, 2004 || Kitt Peak || Spacewatch ||  || align=right | 2.4 km || 
|-id=521 bgcolor=#E9E9E9
| 532521 ||  || — || October 4, 2013 || Mount Lemmon || Mount Lemmon Survey ||  || align=right | 1.7 km || 
|-id=522 bgcolor=#E9E9E9
| 532522 ||  || — || September 22, 2009 || Mount Lemmon || Mount Lemmon Survey ||  || align=right | 1.2 km || 
|-id=523 bgcolor=#E9E9E9
| 532523 ||  || — || August 15, 2013 || Haleakala || Pan-STARRS ||  || align=right | 1.3 km || 
|-id=524 bgcolor=#d6d6d6
| 532524 ||  || — || September 1, 2013 || Mount Lemmon || Mount Lemmon Survey || KOR || align=right | 1.2 km || 
|-id=525 bgcolor=#E9E9E9
| 532525 ||  || — || November 9, 2004 || Catalina || CSS ||  || align=right | 2.2 km || 
|-id=526 bgcolor=#d6d6d6
| 532526 ||  || — || October 2, 2013 || Kitt Peak || Spacewatch ||  || align=right | 2.6 km || 
|-id=527 bgcolor=#E9E9E9
| 532527 ||  || — || September 1, 2013 || Mount Lemmon || Mount Lemmon Survey || AGN || align=right | 1.0 km || 
|-id=528 bgcolor=#fefefe
| 532528 ||  || — || September 25, 2013 || Mount Lemmon || Mount Lemmon Survey ||  || align=right data-sort-value="0.63" | 630 m || 
|-id=529 bgcolor=#E9E9E9
| 532529 ||  || — || May 12, 2012 || Mount Lemmon || Mount Lemmon Survey ||  || align=right | 1.6 km || 
|-id=530 bgcolor=#E9E9E9
| 532530 ||  || — || September 28, 2013 || Mount Lemmon || Mount Lemmon Survey ||  || align=right | 2.2 km || 
|-id=531 bgcolor=#fefefe
| 532531 ||  || — || August 14, 2009 || La Sagra || OAM Obs. ||  || align=right data-sort-value="0.80" | 800 m || 
|-id=532 bgcolor=#d6d6d6
| 532532 ||  || — || September 29, 2013 || Mount Lemmon || Mount Lemmon Survey ||  || align=right | 2.8 km || 
|-id=533 bgcolor=#d6d6d6
| 532533 ||  || — || November 2, 2008 || Mount Lemmon || Mount Lemmon Survey ||  || align=right | 1.9 km || 
|-id=534 bgcolor=#E9E9E9
| 532534 ||  || — || September 15, 2013 || Haleakala || Pan-STARRS ||  || align=right | 1.2 km || 
|-id=535 bgcolor=#E9E9E9
| 532535 ||  || — || April 14, 2010 || WISE || WISE ||  || align=right | 2.5 km || 
|-id=536 bgcolor=#d6d6d6
| 532536 ||  || — || July 29, 2008 || Mount Lemmon || Mount Lemmon Survey ||  || align=right | 3.3 km || 
|-id=537 bgcolor=#C2FFFF
| 532537 ||  || — || August 2, 2011 || Haleakala || Pan-STARRS || L5 || align=right | 7.7 km || 
|-id=538 bgcolor=#d6d6d6
| 532538 ||  || — || September 29, 2008 || Mount Lemmon || Mount Lemmon Survey ||  || align=right | 2.3 km || 
|-id=539 bgcolor=#E9E9E9
| 532539 ||  || — || October 6, 2004 || Kitt Peak || Spacewatch ||  || align=right | 1.6 km || 
|-id=540 bgcolor=#d6d6d6
| 532540 ||  || — || July 20, 2013 || Haleakala || Pan-STARRS ||  || align=right | 2.8 km || 
|-id=541 bgcolor=#fefefe
| 532541 ||  || — || September 30, 2006 || Mount Lemmon || Mount Lemmon Survey ||  || align=right data-sort-value="0.82" | 820 m || 
|-id=542 bgcolor=#E9E9E9
| 532542 ||  || — || October 2, 2013 || Kitt Peak || Spacewatch ||  || align=right | 1.1 km || 
|-id=543 bgcolor=#d6d6d6
| 532543 ||  || — || September 5, 2013 || Haleakala || Pan-STARRS ||  || align=right | 2.5 km || 
|-id=544 bgcolor=#E9E9E9
| 532544 ||  || — || September 23, 2009 || Kitt Peak || Spacewatch ||  || align=right | 1.6 km || 
|-id=545 bgcolor=#d6d6d6
| 532545 ||  || — || October 8, 2008 || Kitt Peak || Spacewatch ||  || align=right | 1.7 km || 
|-id=546 bgcolor=#FA8072
| 532546 ||  || — || January 26, 2011 || Mount Lemmon || Mount Lemmon Survey ||  || align=right data-sort-value="0.76" | 760 m || 
|-id=547 bgcolor=#d6d6d6
| 532547 ||  || — || October 8, 2008 || Kitt Peak || Spacewatch ||  || align=right | 1.8 km || 
|-id=548 bgcolor=#E9E9E9
| 532548 ||  || — || October 2, 2013 || Mount Lemmon || Mount Lemmon Survey ||  || align=right | 1.3 km || 
|-id=549 bgcolor=#E9E9E9
| 532549 ||  || — || April 2, 2010 || WISE || WISE || DOR || align=right | 2.3 km || 
|-id=550 bgcolor=#E9E9E9
| 532550 ||  || — || November 29, 2000 || Kitt Peak || Spacewatch ||  || align=right | 1.3 km || 
|-id=551 bgcolor=#d6d6d6
| 532551 ||  || — || December 1, 2008 || Kitt Peak || Spacewatch ||  || align=right | 2.7 km || 
|-id=552 bgcolor=#E9E9E9
| 532552 ||  || — || October 3, 2013 || Kitt Peak || Spacewatch ||  || align=right | 1.4 km || 
|-id=553 bgcolor=#E9E9E9
| 532553 ||  || — || July 20, 2013 || Haleakala || Pan-STARRS ||  || align=right | 2.4 km || 
|-id=554 bgcolor=#fefefe
| 532554 ||  || — || September 17, 2009 || Kitt Peak || Spacewatch ||  || align=right data-sort-value="0.97" | 970 m || 
|-id=555 bgcolor=#d6d6d6
| 532555 ||  || — || September 14, 2013 || Mount Lemmon || Mount Lemmon Survey ||  || align=right | 2.5 km || 
|-id=556 bgcolor=#E9E9E9
| 532556 ||  || — || October 11, 2004 || Kitt Peak || Spacewatch ||  || align=right | 1.6 km || 
|-id=557 bgcolor=#d6d6d6
| 532557 ||  || — || November 18, 2008 || Kitt Peak || Spacewatch ||  || align=right | 2.8 km || 
|-id=558 bgcolor=#E9E9E9
| 532558 ||  || — || October 1, 2000 || Socorro || LINEAR ||  || align=right | 1.5 km || 
|-id=559 bgcolor=#E9E9E9
| 532559 ||  || — || September 12, 2013 || Mount Lemmon || Mount Lemmon Survey ||  || align=right | 1.2 km || 
|-id=560 bgcolor=#d6d6d6
| 532560 ||  || — || October 27, 2008 || Kitt Peak || Spacewatch ||  || align=right | 2.5 km || 
|-id=561 bgcolor=#E9E9E9
| 532561 ||  || — || November 24, 2009 || Kitt Peak || Spacewatch ||  || align=right | 2.2 km || 
|-id=562 bgcolor=#E9E9E9
| 532562 ||  || — || December 3, 2010 || Mount Lemmon || Mount Lemmon Survey ||  || align=right | 1.4 km || 
|-id=563 bgcolor=#E9E9E9
| 532563 ||  || — || March 31, 2011 || Haleakala || Pan-STARRS ||  || align=right | 2.0 km || 
|-id=564 bgcolor=#E9E9E9
| 532564 ||  || — || January 8, 2010 || Mount Lemmon || Mount Lemmon Survey ||  || align=right | 1.8 km || 
|-id=565 bgcolor=#d6d6d6
| 532565 ||  || — || October 2, 2013 || Haleakala || Pan-STARRS ||  || align=right | 2.2 km || 
|-id=566 bgcolor=#E9E9E9
| 532566 ||  || — || September 4, 2013 || Mount Lemmon || Mount Lemmon Survey ||  || align=right | 2.1 km || 
|-id=567 bgcolor=#d6d6d6
| 532567 ||  || — || May 1, 2011 || Haleakala || Pan-STARRS || EOS || align=right | 2.3 km || 
|-id=568 bgcolor=#d6d6d6
| 532568 ||  || — || May 30, 2010 || WISE || WISE ||  || align=right | 3.1 km || 
|-id=569 bgcolor=#d6d6d6
| 532569 ||  || — || October 8, 2008 || Kitt Peak || Spacewatch ||  || align=right | 1.8 km || 
|-id=570 bgcolor=#d6d6d6
| 532570 ||  || — || January 14, 2010 || WISE || WISE ||  || align=right | 3.4 km || 
|-id=571 bgcolor=#fefefe
| 532571 ||  || — || October 3, 2013 || Haleakala || Pan-STARRS ||  || align=right data-sort-value="0.83" | 830 m || 
|-id=572 bgcolor=#fefefe
| 532572 ||  || — || April 20, 2012 || Mount Lemmon || Mount Lemmon Survey ||  || align=right data-sort-value="0.69" | 690 m || 
|-id=573 bgcolor=#d6d6d6
| 532573 ||  || — || October 3, 2013 || Mount Lemmon || Mount Lemmon Survey ||  || align=right | 2.8 km || 
|-id=574 bgcolor=#fefefe
| 532574 ||  || — || January 16, 2008 || Mount Lemmon || Mount Lemmon Survey ||  || align=right data-sort-value="0.60" | 600 m || 
|-id=575 bgcolor=#d6d6d6
| 532575 ||  || — || October 3, 2013 || Haleakala || Pan-STARRS || KOR || align=right | 1.2 km || 
|-id=576 bgcolor=#E9E9E9
| 532576 ||  || — || October 15, 2004 || Mount Lemmon || Mount Lemmon Survey ||  || align=right | 2.4 km || 
|-id=577 bgcolor=#fefefe
| 532577 ||  || — || October 1, 2013 || Mount Lemmon || Mount Lemmon Survey ||  || align=right data-sort-value="0.55" | 550 m || 
|-id=578 bgcolor=#E9E9E9
| 532578 ||  || — || February 7, 2006 || Kitt Peak || Spacewatch ||  || align=right | 1.3 km || 
|-id=579 bgcolor=#E9E9E9
| 532579 ||  || — || November 3, 2005 || Mount Lemmon || Mount Lemmon Survey ||  || align=right data-sort-value="0.89" | 890 m || 
|-id=580 bgcolor=#E9E9E9
| 532580 ||  || — || October 3, 2013 || Haleakala || Pan-STARRS ||  || align=right | 1.1 km || 
|-id=581 bgcolor=#E9E9E9
| 532581 ||  || — || October 13, 2013 || Kitt Peak || Spacewatch ||  || align=right | 1.5 km || 
|-id=582 bgcolor=#E9E9E9
| 532582 ||  || — || November 1, 2005 || Mount Lemmon || Mount Lemmon Survey ||  || align=right data-sort-value="0.66" | 660 m || 
|-id=583 bgcolor=#E9E9E9
| 532583 ||  || — || February 28, 2010 || WISE || WISE ||  || align=right | 1.9 km || 
|-id=584 bgcolor=#d6d6d6
| 532584 ||  || — || October 8, 2013 || Mount Lemmon || Mount Lemmon Survey ||  || align=right | 2.9 km || 
|-id=585 bgcolor=#d6d6d6
| 532585 ||  || — || September 9, 2008 || Mount Lemmon || Mount Lemmon Survey ||  || align=right | 1.9 km || 
|-id=586 bgcolor=#d6d6d6
| 532586 ||  || — || October 3, 2013 || Haleakala || Pan-STARRS ||  || align=right | 2.2 km || 
|-id=587 bgcolor=#E9E9E9
| 532587 ||  || — || June 8, 2012 || Mount Lemmon || Mount Lemmon Survey ||  || align=right | 1.8 km || 
|-id=588 bgcolor=#E9E9E9
| 532588 ||  || — || October 9, 2013 || Mount Lemmon || Mount Lemmon Survey ||  || align=right | 1.5 km || 
|-id=589 bgcolor=#d6d6d6
| 532589 ||  || — || October 13, 2013 || Kitt Peak || Spacewatch ||  || align=right | 2.1 km || 
|-id=590 bgcolor=#E9E9E9
| 532590 ||  || — || October 7, 2013 || Mount Lemmon || Mount Lemmon Survey ||  || align=right | 1.9 km || 
|-id=591 bgcolor=#d6d6d6
| 532591 ||  || — || October 2, 2013 || Mount Lemmon || Mount Lemmon Survey ||  || align=right | 1.8 km || 
|-id=592 bgcolor=#E9E9E9
| 532592 ||  || — || May 30, 2008 || Mount Lemmon || Mount Lemmon Survey ||  || align=right | 1.2 km || 
|-id=593 bgcolor=#d6d6d6
| 532593 ||  || — || October 12, 2007 || Catalina || CSS ||  || align=right | 3.5 km || 
|-id=594 bgcolor=#E9E9E9
| 532594 ||  || — || August 22, 2004 || Kitt Peak || Spacewatch ||  || align=right | 1.3 km || 
|-id=595 bgcolor=#E9E9E9
| 532595 ||  || — || October 2, 2013 || Haleakala || Pan-STARRS ||  || align=right | 1.7 km || 
|-id=596 bgcolor=#d6d6d6
| 532596 ||  || — || September 19, 2008 || Kitt Peak || Spacewatch ||  || align=right | 1.7 km || 
|-id=597 bgcolor=#E9E9E9
| 532597 ||  || — || October 2, 2013 || Haleakala || Pan-STARRS ||  || align=right data-sort-value="0.70" | 700 m || 
|-id=598 bgcolor=#d6d6d6
| 532598 ||  || — || October 25, 2008 || Kitt Peak || Spacewatch ||  || align=right | 2.1 km || 
|-id=599 bgcolor=#E9E9E9
| 532599 ||  || — || October 23, 2009 || Mount Lemmon || Mount Lemmon Survey ||  || align=right data-sort-value="0.91" | 910 m || 
|-id=600 bgcolor=#E9E9E9
| 532600 ||  || — || October 3, 2013 || Kitt Peak || Spacewatch ||  || align=right | 1.2 km || 
|}

532601–532700 

|-bgcolor=#fefefe
| 532601 ||  || — || May 20, 2012 || Mount Lemmon || Mount Lemmon Survey ||  || align=right data-sort-value="0.72" | 720 m || 
|-id=602 bgcolor=#d6d6d6
| 532602 ||  || — || September 20, 2008 || Mount Lemmon || Mount Lemmon Survey ||  || align=right | 1.9 km || 
|-id=603 bgcolor=#E9E9E9
| 532603 ||  || — || October 3, 2013 || Haleakala || Pan-STARRS ||  || align=right | 1.0 km || 
|-id=604 bgcolor=#E9E9E9
| 532604 ||  || — || October 3, 2013 || Haleakala || Pan-STARRS ||  || align=right | 1.2 km || 
|-id=605 bgcolor=#d6d6d6
| 532605 ||  || — || March 30, 2011 || Mount Lemmon || Mount Lemmon Survey ||  || align=right | 1.8 km || 
|-id=606 bgcolor=#fefefe
| 532606 ||  || — || October 3, 2013 || Haleakala || Pan-STARRS ||  || align=right data-sort-value="0.83" | 830 m || 
|-id=607 bgcolor=#E9E9E9
| 532607 ||  || — || October 15, 2004 || Kitt Peak || Spacewatch ||  || align=right | 1.3 km || 
|-id=608 bgcolor=#fefefe
| 532608 ||  || — || March 31, 2008 || Kitt Peak || Spacewatch ||  || align=right data-sort-value="0.69" | 690 m || 
|-id=609 bgcolor=#E9E9E9
| 532609 ||  || — || October 28, 2005 || Mount Lemmon || Mount Lemmon Survey ||  || align=right data-sort-value="0.72" | 720 m || 
|-id=610 bgcolor=#d6d6d6
| 532610 ||  || — || October 9, 2013 || Kitt Peak || Spacewatch ||  || align=right | 2.4 km || 
|-id=611 bgcolor=#E9E9E9
| 532611 ||  || — || September 5, 2013 || Kitt Peak || Spacewatch ||  || align=right | 1.8 km || 
|-id=612 bgcolor=#fefefe
| 532612 ||  || — || May 3, 2008 || Kitt Peak || Spacewatch ||  || align=right data-sort-value="0.89" | 890 m || 
|-id=613 bgcolor=#d6d6d6
| 532613 ||  || — || October 14, 2013 || Mount Lemmon || Mount Lemmon Survey ||  || align=right | 2.7 km || 
|-id=614 bgcolor=#E9E9E9
| 532614 ||  || — || October 2, 2013 || Kitt Peak || Spacewatch ||  || align=right data-sort-value="0.71" | 710 m || 
|-id=615 bgcolor=#C2FFFF
| 532615 ||  || — || July 27, 2011 || Haleakala || Pan-STARRS || L5 || align=right | 8.3 km || 
|-id=616 bgcolor=#fefefe
| 532616 ||  || — || October 2, 2013 || Catalina || CSS ||  || align=right data-sort-value="0.98" | 980 m || 
|-id=617 bgcolor=#E9E9E9
| 532617 ||  || — || October 6, 2013 || Mount Lemmon || Mount Lemmon Survey ||  || align=right | 1.7 km || 
|-id=618 bgcolor=#fefefe
| 532618 ||  || — || October 5, 2013 || Haleakala || Pan-STARRS ||  || align=right data-sort-value="0.71" | 710 m || 
|-id=619 bgcolor=#d6d6d6
| 532619 ||  || — || October 13, 2013 || Mount Lemmon || Mount Lemmon Survey ||  || align=right | 2.6 km || 
|-id=620 bgcolor=#fefefe
| 532620 ||  || — || October 16, 2013 || Mount Lemmon || Mount Lemmon Survey || H || align=right data-sort-value="0.82" | 820 m || 
|-id=621 bgcolor=#FA8072
| 532621 ||  || — || October 4, 2013 || Catalina || CSS || H || align=right data-sort-value="0.55" | 550 m || 
|-id=622 bgcolor=#fefefe
| 532622 ||  || — || October 20, 2008 || Kitt Peak || Spacewatch || H || align=right data-sort-value="0.41" | 410 m || 
|-id=623 bgcolor=#fefefe
| 532623 ||  || — || September 25, 2013 || Kitt Peak || Spacewatch || H || align=right data-sort-value="0.70" | 700 m || 
|-id=624 bgcolor=#d6d6d6
| 532624 ||  || — || September 28, 2008 || Mount Lemmon || Mount Lemmon Survey ||  || align=right | 2.8 km || 
|-id=625 bgcolor=#E9E9E9
| 532625 ||  || — || May 13, 2012 || Mount Lemmon || Mount Lemmon Survey ||  || align=right | 2.2 km || 
|-id=626 bgcolor=#d6d6d6
| 532626 ||  || — || October 2, 2013 || Kitt Peak || Spacewatch ||  || align=right | 2.4 km || 
|-id=627 bgcolor=#fefefe
| 532627 ||  || — || October 2, 2013 || Catalina || CSS || H || align=right data-sort-value="0.70" | 700 m || 
|-id=628 bgcolor=#d6d6d6
| 532628 ||  || — || October 12, 2013 || Kitt Peak || Spacewatch ||  || align=right | 2.0 km || 
|-id=629 bgcolor=#E9E9E9
| 532629 ||  || — || October 15, 2013 || Mount Lemmon || Mount Lemmon Survey ||  || align=right | 1.9 km || 
|-id=630 bgcolor=#d6d6d6
| 532630 ||  || — || July 14, 2013 || Haleakala || Pan-STARRS ||  || align=right | 2.8 km || 
|-id=631 bgcolor=#E9E9E9
| 532631 ||  || — || November 25, 2005 || Kitt Peak || Spacewatch ||  || align=right data-sort-value="0.82" | 820 m || 
|-id=632 bgcolor=#E9E9E9
| 532632 ||  || — || September 22, 2008 || Mount Lemmon || Mount Lemmon Survey ||  || align=right | 2.3 km || 
|-id=633 bgcolor=#d6d6d6
| 532633 ||  || — || April 5, 2011 || Kitt Peak || Spacewatch ||  || align=right | 2.8 km || 
|-id=634 bgcolor=#C2FFFF
| 532634 ||  || — || October 24, 2013 || Mount Lemmon || Mount Lemmon Survey || L5 || align=right | 5.8 km || 
|-id=635 bgcolor=#d6d6d6
| 532635 ||  || — || January 16, 2004 || Kitt Peak || Spacewatch ||  || align=right | 1.7 km || 
|-id=636 bgcolor=#d6d6d6
| 532636 ||  || — || September 28, 2003 || Anderson Mesa || LONEOS ||  || align=right | 2.7 km || 
|-id=637 bgcolor=#d6d6d6
| 532637 ||  || — || November 20, 2008 || Kitt Peak || Spacewatch ||  || align=right | 2.5 km || 
|-id=638 bgcolor=#d6d6d6
| 532638 ||  || — || July 19, 2007 || Mount Lemmon || Mount Lemmon Survey ||  || align=right | 2.5 km || 
|-id=639 bgcolor=#E9E9E9
| 532639 ||  || — || November 27, 2009 || Mount Lemmon || Mount Lemmon Survey ||  || align=right | 2.8 km || 
|-id=640 bgcolor=#d6d6d6
| 532640 ||  || — || January 30, 2000 || Kitt Peak || Spacewatch ||  || align=right | 2.8 km || 
|-id=641 bgcolor=#E9E9E9
| 532641 ||  || — || October 25, 2013 || Kitt Peak || Spacewatch ||  || align=right | 2.0 km || 
|-id=642 bgcolor=#E9E9E9
| 532642 ||  || — || March 13, 2007 || Mount Lemmon || Mount Lemmon Survey ||  || align=right data-sort-value="0.88" | 880 m || 
|-id=643 bgcolor=#E9E9E9
| 532643 ||  || — || December 2, 2005 || Kitt Peak || Spacewatch ||  || align=right | 1.5 km || 
|-id=644 bgcolor=#E9E9E9
| 532644 ||  || — || November 20, 2009 || Kitt Peak || Spacewatch ||  || align=right | 1.8 km || 
|-id=645 bgcolor=#d6d6d6
| 532645 ||  || — || October 24, 2013 || Kitt Peak || Spacewatch ||  || align=right | 2.4 km || 
|-id=646 bgcolor=#E9E9E9
| 532646 ||  || — || October 25, 2013 || Mount Lemmon || Mount Lemmon Survey ||  || align=right data-sort-value="0.84" | 840 m || 
|-id=647 bgcolor=#E9E9E9
| 532647 ||  || — || January 12, 2010 || Mount Lemmon || Mount Lemmon Survey ||  || align=right | 1.6 km || 
|-id=648 bgcolor=#d6d6d6
| 532648 ||  || — || November 22, 2008 || Kitt Peak || Spacewatch ||  || align=right | 3.1 km || 
|-id=649 bgcolor=#E9E9E9
| 532649 ||  || — || October 26, 2013 || Kitt Peak || Spacewatch ||  || align=right | 1.8 km || 
|-id=650 bgcolor=#fefefe
| 532650 ||  || — || October 26, 2013 || Kitt Peak || Spacewatch ||  || align=right data-sort-value="0.84" | 840 m || 
|-id=651 bgcolor=#d6d6d6
| 532651 ||  || — || October 26, 2013 || Mount Lemmon || Mount Lemmon Survey ||  || align=right | 2.3 km || 
|-id=652 bgcolor=#d6d6d6
| 532652 ||  || — || May 21, 2011 || Mount Lemmon || Mount Lemmon Survey ||  || align=right | 2.8 km || 
|-id=653 bgcolor=#d6d6d6
| 532653 ||  || — || May 25, 2006 || Mount Lemmon || Mount Lemmon Survey ||  || align=right | 2.2 km || 
|-id=654 bgcolor=#d6d6d6
| 532654 ||  || — || September 14, 2007 || Kitt Peak || Spacewatch ||  || align=right | 2.2 km || 
|-id=655 bgcolor=#d6d6d6
| 532655 ||  || — || November 21, 2008 || Kitt Peak || Spacewatch ||  || align=right | 2.6 km || 
|-id=656 bgcolor=#d6d6d6
| 532656 ||  || — || October 30, 2007 || Mount Lemmon || Mount Lemmon Survey ||  || align=right | 3.1 km || 
|-id=657 bgcolor=#fefefe
| 532657 ||  || — || October 30, 2013 || Haleakala || Pan-STARRS ||  || align=right data-sort-value="0.77" | 770 m || 
|-id=658 bgcolor=#d6d6d6
| 532658 ||  || — || October 6, 2013 || Kitt Peak || Spacewatch ||  || align=right | 3.6 km || 
|-id=659 bgcolor=#E9E9E9
| 532659 ||  || — || October 14, 2013 || Mount Lemmon || Mount Lemmon Survey ||  || align=right | 2.2 km || 
|-id=660 bgcolor=#C7FF8F
| 532660 ||  || — || August 18, 2010 || Haleakala || Pan-STARRS || centaur || align=right | 11 km || 
|-id=661 bgcolor=#d6d6d6
| 532661 ||  || — || November 1, 2013 || Catalina || CSS ||  || align=right | 2.4 km || 
|-id=662 bgcolor=#E9E9E9
| 532662 ||  || — || October 2, 2013 || Kitt Peak || Spacewatch ||  || align=right | 1.2 km || 
|-id=663 bgcolor=#fefefe
| 532663 ||  || — || November 4, 2013 || Kitt Peak || Spacewatch || H || align=right data-sort-value="0.76" | 760 m || 
|-id=664 bgcolor=#E9E9E9
| 532664 ||  || — || October 3, 2013 || Catalina || CSS ||  || align=right | 1.8 km || 
|-id=665 bgcolor=#d6d6d6
| 532665 ||  || — || October 7, 2013 || Catalina || CSS ||  || align=right | 2.6 km || 
|-id=666 bgcolor=#d6d6d6
| 532666 ||  || — || October 16, 2013 || Catalina || CSS ||  || align=right | 2.7 km || 
|-id=667 bgcolor=#d6d6d6
| 532667 ||  || — || November 7, 2008 || Mount Lemmon || Mount Lemmon Survey ||  || align=right | 2.3 km || 
|-id=668 bgcolor=#fefefe
| 532668 ||  || — || July 19, 2013 || Haleakala || Pan-STARRS || H || align=right data-sort-value="0.65" | 650 m || 
|-id=669 bgcolor=#fefefe
| 532669 ||  || — || November 3, 2008 || Catalina || CSS || H || align=right data-sort-value="0.57" | 570 m || 
|-id=670 bgcolor=#fefefe
| 532670 ||  || — || November 9, 2013 || Haleakala || Pan-STARRS || H || align=right data-sort-value="0.53" | 530 m || 
|-id=671 bgcolor=#d6d6d6
| 532671 ||  || — || July 20, 2013 || Haleakala || Pan-STARRS ||  || align=right | 2.4 km || 
|-id=672 bgcolor=#fefefe
| 532672 ||  || — || April 24, 2012 || Haleakala || Pan-STARRS || H || align=right data-sort-value="0.66" | 660 m || 
|-id=673 bgcolor=#d6d6d6
| 532673 ||  || — || November 2, 2013 || Mount Lemmon || Mount Lemmon Survey ||  || align=right | 3.0 km || 
|-id=674 bgcolor=#d6d6d6
| 532674 ||  || — || July 18, 2013 || Haleakala || Pan-STARRS ||  || align=right | 2.6 km || 
|-id=675 bgcolor=#E9E9E9
| 532675 ||  || — || March 31, 2010 || WISE || WISE ||  || align=right | 2.2 km || 
|-id=676 bgcolor=#E9E9E9
| 532676 ||  || — || September 14, 2013 || Mount Lemmon || Mount Lemmon Survey ||  || align=right | 1.5 km || 
|-id=677 bgcolor=#E9E9E9
| 532677 ||  || — || March 17, 2010 || WISE || WISE ||  || align=right | 1.9 km || 
|-id=678 bgcolor=#E9E9E9
| 532678 ||  || — || November 1, 2013 || Mount Lemmon || Mount Lemmon Survey ||  || align=right | 1.5 km || 
|-id=679 bgcolor=#E9E9E9
| 532679 ||  || — || September 5, 2008 || Kitt Peak || Spacewatch ||  || align=right | 1.9 km || 
|-id=680 bgcolor=#E9E9E9
| 532680 ||  || — || November 12, 2013 || Mount Lemmon || Mount Lemmon Survey ||  || align=right | 1.6 km || 
|-id=681 bgcolor=#d6d6d6
| 532681 ||  || — || September 15, 2007 || Kitt Peak || Spacewatch ||  || align=right | 2.6 km || 
|-id=682 bgcolor=#E9E9E9
| 532682 ||  || — || February 2, 2006 || Kitt Peak || Spacewatch ||  || align=right | 1.6 km || 
|-id=683 bgcolor=#d6d6d6
| 532683 ||  || — || May 19, 2010 || WISE || WISE ||  || align=right | 3.4 km || 
|-id=684 bgcolor=#d6d6d6
| 532684 ||  || — || November 10, 2013 || Kitt Peak || Spacewatch ||  || align=right | 3.0 km || 
|-id=685 bgcolor=#E9E9E9
| 532685 ||  || — || December 2, 2004 || Kitt Peak || Spacewatch ||  || align=right | 3.4 km || 
|-id=686 bgcolor=#E9E9E9
| 532686 ||  || — || November 26, 2009 || Mount Lemmon || Mount Lemmon Survey ||  || align=right | 1.2 km || 
|-id=687 bgcolor=#d6d6d6
| 532687 ||  || — || October 17, 2012 || Mount Lemmon || Mount Lemmon Survey ||  || align=right | 2.6 km || 
|-id=688 bgcolor=#E9E9E9
| 532688 ||  || — || November 2, 2013 || Kitt Peak || Spacewatch ||  || align=right | 1.5 km || 
|-id=689 bgcolor=#E9E9E9
| 532689 ||  || — || October 10, 2008 || Mount Lemmon || Mount Lemmon Survey ||  || align=right | 1.9 km || 
|-id=690 bgcolor=#E9E9E9
| 532690 ||  || — || November 9, 2013 || Haleakala || Pan-STARRS ||  || align=right | 1.4 km || 
|-id=691 bgcolor=#E9E9E9
| 532691 ||  || — || September 25, 2008 || Kitt Peak || Spacewatch ||  || align=right | 2.0 km || 
|-id=692 bgcolor=#E9E9E9
| 532692 ||  || — || November 2, 2013 || Kitt Peak || Spacewatch ||  || align=right | 1.6 km || 
|-id=693 bgcolor=#E9E9E9
| 532693 ||  || — || January 17, 2010 || Kitt Peak || Spacewatch ||  || align=right | 1.4 km || 
|-id=694 bgcolor=#E9E9E9
| 532694 ||  || — || December 13, 2004 || Campo Imperatore || CINEOS ||  || align=right | 1.8 km || 
|-id=695 bgcolor=#E9E9E9
| 532695 ||  || — || January 10, 2006 || Mount Lemmon || Mount Lemmon Survey ||  || align=right data-sort-value="0.64" | 640 m || 
|-id=696 bgcolor=#d6d6d6
| 532696 ||  || — || September 23, 2008 || Mount Lemmon || Mount Lemmon Survey ||  || align=right | 1.8 km || 
|-id=697 bgcolor=#E9E9E9
| 532697 ||  || — || November 9, 2013 || Haleakala || Pan-STARRS ||  || align=right data-sort-value="0.93" | 930 m || 
|-id=698 bgcolor=#d6d6d6
| 532698 ||  || — || November 18, 2008 || Kitt Peak || Spacewatch ||  || align=right | 1.9 km || 
|-id=699 bgcolor=#E9E9E9
| 532699 ||  || — || September 28, 2003 || Kitt Peak || Spacewatch ||  || align=right | 2.6 km || 
|-id=700 bgcolor=#E9E9E9
| 532700 ||  || — || March 29, 2010 || WISE || WISE ||  || align=right | 2.0 km || 
|}

532701–532800 

|-bgcolor=#d6d6d6
| 532701 ||  || — || November 1, 2013 || Kitt Peak || Spacewatch ||  || align=right | 2.4 km || 
|-id=702 bgcolor=#d6d6d6
| 532702 ||  || — || November 1, 2013 || Kitt Peak || Spacewatch ||  || align=right | 2.9 km || 
|-id=703 bgcolor=#d6d6d6
| 532703 ||  || — || December 4, 2008 || Kitt Peak || Spacewatch ||  || align=right | 1.9 km || 
|-id=704 bgcolor=#d6d6d6
| 532704 ||  || — || November 2, 2013 || Mount Lemmon || Mount Lemmon Survey ||  || align=right | 2.4 km || 
|-id=705 bgcolor=#d6d6d6
| 532705 ||  || — || November 2, 2013 || Mount Lemmon || Mount Lemmon Survey ||  || align=right | 2.7 km || 
|-id=706 bgcolor=#fefefe
| 532706 ||  || — || November 4, 2013 || Mount Lemmon || Mount Lemmon Survey ||  || align=right data-sort-value="0.65" | 650 m || 
|-id=707 bgcolor=#d6d6d6
| 532707 ||  || — || February 12, 2004 || Kitt Peak || Spacewatch ||  || align=right | 2.1 km || 
|-id=708 bgcolor=#d6d6d6
| 532708 ||  || — || November 6, 2013 || Mount Lemmon || Mount Lemmon Survey ||  || align=right | 2.2 km || 
|-id=709 bgcolor=#d6d6d6
| 532709 ||  || — || November 10, 2013 || Kitt Peak || Spacewatch ||  || align=right | 2.3 km || 
|-id=710 bgcolor=#E9E9E9
| 532710 ||  || — || November 11, 2013 || Kitt Peak || Spacewatch ||  || align=right | 2.3 km || 
|-id=711 bgcolor=#E9E9E9
| 532711 ||  || — || November 11, 2013 || Mount Lemmon || Mount Lemmon Survey ||  || align=right | 1.6 km || 
|-id=712 bgcolor=#d6d6d6
| 532712 ||  || — || November 14, 2013 || Mount Lemmon || Mount Lemmon Survey ||  || align=right | 2.9 km || 
|-id=713 bgcolor=#E9E9E9
| 532713 ||  || — || November 1, 2013 || Mount Lemmon || Mount Lemmon Survey ||  || align=right | 1.0 km || 
|-id=714 bgcolor=#E9E9E9
| 532714 ||  || — || November 6, 2013 || Haleakala || Pan-STARRS ||  || align=right data-sort-value="0.90" | 900 m || 
|-id=715 bgcolor=#E9E9E9
| 532715 ||  || — || November 6, 2013 || Mount Lemmon || Mount Lemmon Survey ||  || align=right | 2.0 km || 
|-id=716 bgcolor=#E9E9E9
| 532716 ||  || — || November 7, 2013 || Kitt Peak || Spacewatch ||  || align=right | 1.8 km || 
|-id=717 bgcolor=#d6d6d6
| 532717 ||  || — || November 2, 2008 || Mount Lemmon || Mount Lemmon Survey ||  || align=right | 2.0 km || 
|-id=718 bgcolor=#E9E9E9
| 532718 ||  || — || November 8, 2013 || Kitt Peak || Spacewatch ||  || align=right data-sort-value="0.73" | 730 m || 
|-id=719 bgcolor=#E9E9E9
| 532719 ||  || — || November 10, 2013 || Mount Lemmon || Mount Lemmon Survey ||  || align=right | 1.6 km || 
|-id=720 bgcolor=#E9E9E9
| 532720 ||  || — || November 6, 2013 || Haleakala || Pan-STARRS ||  || align=right | 1.7 km || 
|-id=721 bgcolor=#d6d6d6
| 532721 ||  || — || November 9, 2013 || Haleakala || Pan-STARRS ||  || align=right | 2.8 km || 
|-id=722 bgcolor=#d6d6d6
| 532722 ||  || — || May 22, 2011 || Mount Lemmon || Mount Lemmon Survey ||  || align=right | 5.0 km || 
|-id=723 bgcolor=#fefefe
| 532723 ||  || — || October 31, 2013 || Kitt Peak || Spacewatch || H || align=right data-sort-value="0.65" | 650 m || 
|-id=724 bgcolor=#d6d6d6
| 532724 ||  || — || September 15, 2007 || Mount Lemmon || Mount Lemmon Survey || Tj (2.98) || align=right | 3.1 km || 
|-id=725 bgcolor=#E9E9E9
| 532725 ||  || — || October 30, 2013 || Haleakala || Pan-STARRS ||  || align=right | 2.0 km || 
|-id=726 bgcolor=#E9E9E9
| 532726 ||  || — || October 26, 2013 || Mount Lemmon || Mount Lemmon Survey ||  || align=right | 1.6 km || 
|-id=727 bgcolor=#d6d6d6
| 532727 ||  || — || September 29, 2013 || Mount Lemmon || Mount Lemmon Survey || EOS || align=right | 2.1 km || 
|-id=728 bgcolor=#E9E9E9
| 532728 ||  || — || November 8, 1996 || Kitt Peak || Spacewatch ||  || align=right | 1.1 km || 
|-id=729 bgcolor=#E9E9E9
| 532729 ||  || — || July 31, 2008 || Siding Spring || SSS ||  || align=right | 2.4 km || 
|-id=730 bgcolor=#E9E9E9
| 532730 ||  || — || November 27, 2013 || Haleakala || Pan-STARRS ||  || align=right | 1.8 km || 
|-id=731 bgcolor=#d6d6d6
| 532731 ||  || — || November 2, 2013 || Mount Lemmon || Mount Lemmon Survey ||  || align=right | 2.9 km || 
|-id=732 bgcolor=#E9E9E9
| 532732 ||  || — || September 3, 2008 || Kitt Peak || Spacewatch ||  || align=right | 1.7 km || 
|-id=733 bgcolor=#d6d6d6
| 532733 ||  || — || June 22, 1995 || Kitt Peak || Spacewatch ||  || align=right | 3.4 km || 
|-id=734 bgcolor=#d6d6d6
| 532734 ||  || — || November 6, 2013 || Haleakala || Pan-STARRS ||  || align=right | 2.5 km || 
|-id=735 bgcolor=#d6d6d6
| 532735 ||  || — || November 6, 2013 || Haleakala || Pan-STARRS ||  || align=right | 2.2 km || 
|-id=736 bgcolor=#d6d6d6
| 532736 ||  || — || December 3, 2008 || Kitt Peak || Spacewatch ||  || align=right | 2.2 km || 
|-id=737 bgcolor=#fefefe
| 532737 ||  || — || April 28, 2012 || Mount Lemmon || Mount Lemmon Survey || H || align=right data-sort-value="0.54" | 540 m || 
|-id=738 bgcolor=#fefefe
| 532738 ||  || — || April 29, 2012 || Kitt Peak || Spacewatch || H || align=right data-sort-value="0.61" | 610 m || 
|-id=739 bgcolor=#fefefe
| 532739 ||  || — || November 10, 2013 || Mount Lemmon || Mount Lemmon Survey || H || align=right data-sort-value="0.73" | 730 m || 
|-id=740 bgcolor=#d6d6d6
| 532740 ||  || — || July 13, 2013 || Haleakala || Pan-STARRS ||  || align=right | 3.4 km || 
|-id=741 bgcolor=#fefefe
| 532741 ||  || — || November 11, 2013 || Mount Lemmon || Mount Lemmon Survey || H || align=right data-sort-value="0.56" | 560 m || 
|-id=742 bgcolor=#d6d6d6
| 532742 ||  || — || March 18, 2010 || Kitt Peak || Spacewatch ||  || align=right | 3.1 km || 
|-id=743 bgcolor=#E9E9E9
| 532743 ||  || — || April 2, 2010 || WISE || WISE || ADE || align=right | 1.5 km || 
|-id=744 bgcolor=#d6d6d6
| 532744 ||  || — || October 30, 2013 || Kitt Peak || Spacewatch ||  || align=right | 3.0 km || 
|-id=745 bgcolor=#C2FFFF
| 532745 ||  || — || August 30, 2011 || Haleakala || Pan-STARRS || L5 || align=right | 7.1 km || 
|-id=746 bgcolor=#E9E9E9
| 532746 ||  || — || November 1, 2013 || Haleakala || Pan-STARRS ||  || align=right | 2.3 km || 
|-id=747 bgcolor=#fefefe
| 532747 ||  || — || November 27, 2000 || Kitt Peak || Spacewatch || H || align=right data-sort-value="0.57" | 570 m || 
|-id=748 bgcolor=#E9E9E9
| 532748 ||  || — || December 9, 2004 || Kitt Peak || Spacewatch || GEF || align=right | 1.0 km || 
|-id=749 bgcolor=#d6d6d6
| 532749 ||  || — || January 19, 2004 || Kitt Peak || Spacewatch ||  || align=right | 1.5 km || 
|-id=750 bgcolor=#E9E9E9
| 532750 ||  || — || November 26, 2013 || Haleakala || Pan-STARRS ||  || align=right | 1.9 km || 
|-id=751 bgcolor=#E9E9E9
| 532751 ||  || — || April 20, 2007 || Mount Lemmon || Mount Lemmon Survey ||  || align=right | 1.2 km || 
|-id=752 bgcolor=#E9E9E9
| 532752 ||  || — || November 27, 2013 || Haleakala || Pan-STARRS ||  || align=right | 1.5 km || 
|-id=753 bgcolor=#d6d6d6
| 532753 ||  || — || December 20, 2008 || La Sagra || OAM Obs. ||  || align=right | 3.2 km || 
|-id=754 bgcolor=#E9E9E9
| 532754 ||  || — || September 3, 2008 || Kitt Peak || Spacewatch ||  || align=right | 1.6 km || 
|-id=755 bgcolor=#d6d6d6
| 532755 ||  || — || November 9, 2008 || Kitt Peak || Spacewatch || KOR || align=right | 1.00 km || 
|-id=756 bgcolor=#d6d6d6
| 532756 ||  || — || November 18, 2008 || Catalina || CSS ||  || align=right | 2.1 km || 
|-id=757 bgcolor=#fefefe
| 532757 ||  || — || April 20, 2012 || Siding Spring || SSS || H || align=right data-sort-value="0.49" | 490 m || 
|-id=758 bgcolor=#fefefe
| 532758 ||  || — || March 26, 2012 || Mount Lemmon || Mount Lemmon Survey || H || align=right data-sort-value="0.45" | 450 m || 
|-id=759 bgcolor=#fefefe
| 532759 ||  || — || November 10, 2013 || Mount Lemmon || Mount Lemmon Survey || H || align=right data-sort-value="0.55" | 550 m || 
|-id=760 bgcolor=#E9E9E9
| 532760 ||  || — || April 13, 2011 || Haleakala || Pan-STARRS || GAL || align=right | 1.7 km || 
|-id=761 bgcolor=#d6d6d6
| 532761 ||  || — || July 18, 2013 || Haleakala || Pan-STARRS ||  || align=right | 2.6 km || 
|-id=762 bgcolor=#E9E9E9
| 532762 ||  || — || October 23, 2013 || Mount Lemmon || Mount Lemmon Survey ||  || align=right | 1.3 km || 
|-id=763 bgcolor=#d6d6d6
| 532763 ||  || — || October 28, 2013 || Mount Lemmon || Mount Lemmon Survey ||  || align=right | 2.8 km || 
|-id=764 bgcolor=#d6d6d6
| 532764 ||  || — || October 3, 2002 || Campo Imperatore || CINEOS ||  || align=right | 2.6 km || 
|-id=765 bgcolor=#d6d6d6
| 532765 ||  || — || August 21, 2012 || Haleakala || Pan-STARRS ||  || align=right | 2.6 km || 
|-id=766 bgcolor=#d6d6d6
| 532766 ||  || — || November 25, 2013 || Haleakala || Pan-STARRS ||  || align=right | 2.5 km || 
|-id=767 bgcolor=#d6d6d6
| 532767 ||  || — || February 25, 2009 || Siding Spring || SSS || Tj (2.98) || align=right | 2.5 km || 
|-id=768 bgcolor=#d6d6d6
| 532768 ||  || — || October 14, 2013 || Mount Lemmon || Mount Lemmon Survey ||  || align=right | 3.1 km || 
|-id=769 bgcolor=#E9E9E9
| 532769 ||  || — || November 11, 2013 || Kitt Peak || Spacewatch ||  || align=right | 1.8 km || 
|-id=770 bgcolor=#E9E9E9
| 532770 ||  || — || April 6, 2011 || Kitt Peak || Spacewatch ||  || align=right | 2.4 km || 
|-id=771 bgcolor=#d6d6d6
| 532771 ||  || — || November 7, 2013 || Kitt Peak || Spacewatch ||  || align=right | 2.6 km || 
|-id=772 bgcolor=#d6d6d6
| 532772 ||  || — || October 9, 2013 || Mount Lemmon || Mount Lemmon Survey ||  || align=right | 2.9 km || 
|-id=773 bgcolor=#E9E9E9
| 532773 ||  || — || November 12, 2013 || Kitt Peak || Spacewatch ||  || align=right | 1.2 km || 
|-id=774 bgcolor=#E9E9E9
| 532774 ||  || — || November 27, 2013 || Haleakala || Pan-STARRS ||  || align=right data-sort-value="0.96" | 960 m || 
|-id=775 bgcolor=#d6d6d6
| 532775 ||  || — || June 3, 2010 || WISE || WISE ||  || align=right | 3.2 km || 
|-id=776 bgcolor=#E9E9E9
| 532776 ||  || — || October 23, 2013 || Haleakala || Pan-STARRS ||  || align=right data-sort-value="0.88" | 880 m || 
|-id=777 bgcolor=#FA8072
| 532777 ||  || — || October 20, 1999 || Socorro || LINEAR ||  || align=right | 2.5 km || 
|-id=778 bgcolor=#E9E9E9
| 532778 ||  || — || May 1, 2010 || WISE || WISE || DOR || align=right | 2.9 km || 
|-id=779 bgcolor=#E9E9E9
| 532779 ||  || — || January 7, 2006 || Kitt Peak || Spacewatch ||  || align=right data-sort-value="0.58" | 580 m || 
|-id=780 bgcolor=#E9E9E9
| 532780 ||  || — || November 2, 2013 || Mount Lemmon || Mount Lemmon Survey ||  || align=right | 1.7 km || 
|-id=781 bgcolor=#E9E9E9
| 532781 ||  || — || October 26, 2013 || Mount Lemmon || Mount Lemmon Survey ||  || align=right | 1.5 km || 
|-id=782 bgcolor=#d6d6d6
| 532782 ||  || — || November 8, 2013 || Mount Lemmon || Mount Lemmon Survey ||  || align=right | 2.4 km || 
|-id=783 bgcolor=#d6d6d6
| 532783 ||  || — || October 26, 2008 || Mount Lemmon || Mount Lemmon Survey ||  || align=right | 2.6 km || 
|-id=784 bgcolor=#d6d6d6
| 532784 ||  || — || October 26, 2013 || Kitt Peak || Spacewatch ||  || align=right | 2.8 km || 
|-id=785 bgcolor=#d6d6d6
| 532785 ||  || — || August 21, 2012 || Haleakala || Pan-STARRS ||  || align=right | 2.9 km || 
|-id=786 bgcolor=#d6d6d6
| 532786 ||  || — || January 28, 2010 || WISE || WISE ||  || align=right | 3.2 km || 
|-id=787 bgcolor=#d6d6d6
| 532787 ||  || — || November 24, 2008 || Mount Lemmon || Mount Lemmon Survey ||  || align=right | 2.1 km || 
|-id=788 bgcolor=#d6d6d6
| 532788 ||  || — || December 30, 2008 || Kitt Peak || Spacewatch ||  || align=right | 2.1 km || 
|-id=789 bgcolor=#E9E9E9
| 532789 ||  || — || January 28, 2006 || Kitt Peak || Spacewatch ||  || align=right data-sort-value="0.92" | 920 m || 
|-id=790 bgcolor=#d6d6d6
| 532790 ||  || — || January 29, 2010 || WISE || WISE ||  || align=right | 3.4 km || 
|-id=791 bgcolor=#d6d6d6
| 532791 ||  || — || November 27, 2013 || Haleakala || Pan-STARRS ||  || align=right | 2.4 km || 
|-id=792 bgcolor=#E9E9E9
| 532792 ||  || — || October 27, 2013 || Catalina || CSS ||  || align=right | 2.2 km || 
|-id=793 bgcolor=#E9E9E9
| 532793 ||  || — || January 23, 2006 || Mount Lemmon || Mount Lemmon Survey ||  || align=right | 1.1 km || 
|-id=794 bgcolor=#d6d6d6
| 532794 ||  || — || November 28, 2013 || Mount Lemmon || Mount Lemmon Survey ||  || align=right | 2.3 km || 
|-id=795 bgcolor=#E9E9E9
| 532795 ||  || — || May 16, 2010 || WISE || WISE ||  || align=right | 1.9 km || 
|-id=796 bgcolor=#d6d6d6
| 532796 ||  || — || December 30, 2008 || Mount Lemmon || Mount Lemmon Survey ||  || align=right | 1.8 km || 
|-id=797 bgcolor=#E9E9E9
| 532797 ||  || — || March 13, 2011 || Mount Lemmon || Mount Lemmon Survey ||  || align=right data-sort-value="0.91" | 910 m || 
|-id=798 bgcolor=#fefefe
| 532798 ||  || — || October 26, 2009 || Kitt Peak || Spacewatch ||  || align=right data-sort-value="0.83" | 830 m || 
|-id=799 bgcolor=#d6d6d6
| 532799 ||  || — || November 10, 2013 || Kitt Peak || Spacewatch ||  || align=right | 2.3 km || 
|-id=800 bgcolor=#d6d6d6
| 532800 ||  || — || July 16, 2013 || Haleakala || Pan-STARRS || LIX || align=right | 3.6 km || 
|}

532801–532900 

|-bgcolor=#E9E9E9
| 532801 ||  || — || October 6, 2008 || Mount Lemmon || Mount Lemmon Survey ||  || align=right | 2.2 km || 
|-id=802 bgcolor=#d6d6d6
| 532802 ||  || — || October 7, 2007 || Kitt Peak || Spacewatch ||  || align=right | 3.0 km || 
|-id=803 bgcolor=#d6d6d6
| 532803 ||  || — || November 23, 2008 || Kitt Peak || Spacewatch ||  || align=right | 2.0 km || 
|-id=804 bgcolor=#d6d6d6
| 532804 ||  || — || November 29, 2013 || Haleakala || Pan-STARRS ||  || align=right | 2.9 km || 
|-id=805 bgcolor=#d6d6d6
| 532805 ||  || — || July 13, 2013 || Haleakala || Pan-STARRS ||  || align=right | 4.0 km || 
|-id=806 bgcolor=#d6d6d6
| 532806 ||  || — || May 15, 2010 || WISE || WISE ||  || align=right | 2.7 km || 
|-id=807 bgcolor=#E9E9E9
| 532807 ||  || — || February 15, 2010 || Mount Lemmon || Mount Lemmon Survey ||  || align=right | 1.6 km || 
|-id=808 bgcolor=#fefefe
| 532808 ||  || — || October 25, 2005 || Catalina || CSS || H || align=right data-sort-value="0.60" | 600 m || 
|-id=809 bgcolor=#E9E9E9
| 532809 ||  || — || November 27, 2013 || Haleakala || Pan-STARRS ||  || align=right | 1.4 km || 
|-id=810 bgcolor=#d6d6d6
| 532810 ||  || — || September 18, 2012 || Mount Lemmon || Mount Lemmon Survey ||  || align=right | 2.9 km || 
|-id=811 bgcolor=#d6d6d6
| 532811 ||  || — || November 4, 2007 || Mount Lemmon || Mount Lemmon Survey ||  || align=right | 2.9 km || 
|-id=812 bgcolor=#E9E9E9
| 532812 ||  || — || December 17, 2009 || Mount Lemmon || Mount Lemmon Survey ||  || align=right | 1.3 km || 
|-id=813 bgcolor=#d6d6d6
| 532813 ||  || — || September 24, 2008 || Mount Lemmon || Mount Lemmon Survey ||  || align=right | 2.2 km || 
|-id=814 bgcolor=#E9E9E9
| 532814 ||  || — || September 29, 2008 || Mount Lemmon || Mount Lemmon Survey ||  || align=right | 2.1 km || 
|-id=815 bgcolor=#d6d6d6
| 532815 ||  || — || December 31, 2008 || Catalina || CSS ||  || align=right | 3.2 km || 
|-id=816 bgcolor=#d6d6d6
| 532816 ||  || — || November 27, 2013 || Haleakala || Pan-STARRS ||  || align=right | 2.2 km || 
|-id=817 bgcolor=#E9E9E9
| 532817 ||  || — || November 27, 2013 || Haleakala || Pan-STARRS ||  || align=right data-sort-value="0.82" | 820 m || 
|-id=818 bgcolor=#E9E9E9
| 532818 ||  || — || November 27, 2013 || Haleakala || Pan-STARRS ||  || align=right | 2.0 km || 
|-id=819 bgcolor=#d6d6d6
| 532819 ||  || — || November 28, 2013 || Haleakala || Pan-STARRS ||  || align=right | 2.3 km || 
|-id=820 bgcolor=#E9E9E9
| 532820 ||  || — || May 2, 2010 || WISE || WISE ||  || align=right | 2.2 km || 
|-id=821 bgcolor=#d6d6d6
| 532821 ||  || — || June 6, 2010 || WISE || WISE ||  || align=right | 3.0 km || 
|-id=822 bgcolor=#E9E9E9
| 532822 ||  || — || November 29, 2013 || Kitt Peak || Spacewatch ||  || align=right data-sort-value="0.93" | 930 m || 
|-id=823 bgcolor=#d6d6d6
| 532823 ||  || — || November 29, 2013 || Mount Lemmon || Mount Lemmon Survey ||  || align=right | 2.1 km || 
|-id=824 bgcolor=#E9E9E9
| 532824 ||  || — || November 27, 2013 || Haleakala || Pan-STARRS ||  || align=right data-sort-value="0.75" | 750 m || 
|-id=825 bgcolor=#E9E9E9
| 532825 ||  || — || November 28, 2013 || Mount Lemmon || Mount Lemmon Survey ||  || align=right | 1.2 km || 
|-id=826 bgcolor=#E9E9E9
| 532826 ||  || — || December 17, 2009 || Mount Lemmon || Mount Lemmon Survey ||  || align=right | 1.2 km || 
|-id=827 bgcolor=#d6d6d6
| 532827 ||  || — || November 27, 2013 || Haleakala || Pan-STARRS ||  || align=right | 2.7 km || 
|-id=828 bgcolor=#E9E9E9
| 532828 ||  || — || November 28, 2013 || Mount Lemmon || Mount Lemmon Survey ||  || align=right | 2.2 km || 
|-id=829 bgcolor=#fefefe
| 532829 ||  || — || November 12, 2013 || Mount Lemmon || Mount Lemmon Survey || H || align=right data-sort-value="0.62" | 620 m || 
|-id=830 bgcolor=#d6d6d6
| 532830 ||  || — || August 25, 2012 || Kitt Peak || Spacewatch ||  || align=right | 2.7 km || 
|-id=831 bgcolor=#d6d6d6
| 532831 ||  || — || October 6, 2012 || Haleakala || Pan-STARRS ||  || align=right | 2.6 km || 
|-id=832 bgcolor=#d6d6d6
| 532832 ||  || — || September 22, 2012 || Kitt Peak || Spacewatch ||  || align=right | 2.5 km || 
|-id=833 bgcolor=#d6d6d6
| 532833 ||  || — || November 21, 2008 || Kitt Peak || Spacewatch ||  || align=right | 1.9 km || 
|-id=834 bgcolor=#fefefe
| 532834 ||  || — || January 5, 2003 || Socorro || LINEAR || H || align=right data-sort-value="0.90" | 900 m || 
|-id=835 bgcolor=#E9E9E9
| 532835 ||  || — || September 24, 2000 || Socorro || LINEAR || BRG || align=right | 1.3 km || 
|-id=836 bgcolor=#d6d6d6
| 532836 ||  || — || January 23, 2010 || WISE || WISE || EOS || align=right | 4.6 km || 
|-id=837 bgcolor=#E9E9E9
| 532837 ||  || — || December 8, 2004 || Socorro || LINEAR ||  || align=right | 1.9 km || 
|-id=838 bgcolor=#fefefe
| 532838 ||  || — || December 6, 2008 || Mount Lemmon || Mount Lemmon Survey || H || align=right data-sort-value="0.61" | 610 m || 
|-id=839 bgcolor=#d6d6d6
| 532839 ||  || — || February 10, 2010 || WISE || WISE ||  || align=right | 2.8 km || 
|-id=840 bgcolor=#fefefe
| 532840 ||  || — || April 26, 2012 || Haleakala || Pan-STARRS || H || align=right data-sort-value="0.72" | 720 m || 
|-id=841 bgcolor=#FA8072
| 532841 ||  || — || August 10, 2010 || Kitt Peak || Spacewatch ||  || align=right data-sort-value="0.49" | 490 m || 
|-id=842 bgcolor=#E9E9E9
| 532842 ||  || — || March 20, 2007 || Kitt Peak || Spacewatch ||  || align=right | 1.3 km || 
|-id=843 bgcolor=#d6d6d6
| 532843 ||  || — || December 21, 2008 || Kitt Peak || Spacewatch ||  || align=right | 1.9 km || 
|-id=844 bgcolor=#d6d6d6
| 532844 ||  || — || October 10, 2007 || Kitt Peak || Spacewatch ||  || align=right | 3.2 km || 
|-id=845 bgcolor=#E9E9E9
| 532845 ||  || — || April 15, 2010 || WISE || WISE ||  || align=right | 1.3 km || 
|-id=846 bgcolor=#d6d6d6
| 532846 ||  || — || August 26, 2012 || Haleakala || Pan-STARRS || HYG || align=right | 2.6 km || 
|-id=847 bgcolor=#fefefe
| 532847 ||  || — || November 27, 2013 || Haleakala || Pan-STARRS || H || align=right data-sort-value="0.63" | 630 m || 
|-id=848 bgcolor=#E9E9E9
| 532848 ||  || — || December 6, 2013 || Haleakala || Pan-STARRS ||  || align=right | 1.7 km || 
|-id=849 bgcolor=#E9E9E9
| 532849 ||  || — || December 11, 2013 || Haleakala || Pan-STARRS ||  || align=right | 2.1 km || 
|-id=850 bgcolor=#d6d6d6
| 532850 ||  || — || October 30, 2013 || Haleakala || Pan-STARRS ||  || align=right | 2.7 km || 
|-id=851 bgcolor=#fefefe
| 532851 ||  || — || December 12, 2013 || Mount Lemmon || Mount Lemmon Survey || H || align=right data-sort-value="0.53" | 530 m || 
|-id=852 bgcolor=#d6d6d6
| 532852 ||  || — || November 5, 2007 || Kitt Peak || Spacewatch ||  || align=right | 3.5 km || 
|-id=853 bgcolor=#d6d6d6
| 532853 ||  || — || January 18, 2009 || Catalina || CSS ||  || align=right | 2.9 km || 
|-id=854 bgcolor=#fefefe
| 532854 ||  || — || December 30, 2005 || Mount Lemmon || Mount Lemmon Survey || H || align=right data-sort-value="0.54" | 540 m || 
|-id=855 bgcolor=#d6d6d6
| 532855 ||  || — || December 4, 2013 || Haleakala || Pan-STARRS ||  || align=right | 2.4 km || 
|-id=856 bgcolor=#E9E9E9
| 532856 ||  || — || December 20, 2009 || Mount Lemmon || Mount Lemmon Survey ||  || align=right data-sort-value="0.95" | 950 m || 
|-id=857 bgcolor=#E9E9E9
| 532857 ||  || — || February 15, 2010 || Mount Lemmon || Mount Lemmon Survey ||  || align=right | 1.3 km || 
|-id=858 bgcolor=#d6d6d6
| 532858 ||  || — || December 10, 2013 || Mount Lemmon || Mount Lemmon Survey ||  || align=right | 2.0 km || 
|-id=859 bgcolor=#d6d6d6
| 532859 ||  || — || December 10, 2013 || Catalina || CSS ||  || align=right | 2.6 km || 
|-id=860 bgcolor=#E9E9E9
| 532860 ||  || — || December 10, 2013 || Haleakala || Pan-STARRS ||  || align=right | 2.2 km || 
|-id=861 bgcolor=#d6d6d6
| 532861 ||  || — || September 15, 2007 || Catalina || CSS ||  || align=right | 3.1 km || 
|-id=862 bgcolor=#d6d6d6
| 532862 ||  || — || December 13, 2013 || Mount Lemmon || Mount Lemmon Survey ||  || align=right | 2.3 km || 
|-id=863 bgcolor=#E9E9E9
| 532863 ||  || — || November 28, 2013 || Catalina || CSS ||  || align=right | 1.2 km || 
|-id=864 bgcolor=#d6d6d6
| 532864 ||  || — || December 10, 2013 || Mount Lemmon || Mount Lemmon Survey ||  || align=right | 2.2 km || 
|-id=865 bgcolor=#d6d6d6
| 532865 ||  || — || January 28, 2010 || WISE || WISE ||  || align=right | 4.6 km || 
|-id=866 bgcolor=#d6d6d6
| 532866 ||  || — || September 15, 2012 || Mount Lemmon || Mount Lemmon Survey ||  || align=right | 3.2 km || 
|-id=867 bgcolor=#E9E9E9
| 532867 ||  || — || March 13, 2007 || Mount Lemmon || Mount Lemmon Survey ||  || align=right data-sort-value="0.97" | 970 m || 
|-id=868 bgcolor=#E9E9E9
| 532868 ||  || — || September 7, 2008 || Mount Lemmon || Mount Lemmon Survey ||  || align=right data-sort-value="0.95" | 950 m || 
|-id=869 bgcolor=#E9E9E9
| 532869 ||  || — || November 1, 2008 || Mount Lemmon || Mount Lemmon Survey ||  || align=right | 1.7 km || 
|-id=870 bgcolor=#d6d6d6
| 532870 ||  || — || December 29, 2008 || Kitt Peak || Spacewatch ||  || align=right | 1.7 km || 
|-id=871 bgcolor=#E9E9E9
| 532871 ||  || — || December 24, 2013 || Mount Lemmon || Mount Lemmon Survey ||  || align=right | 2.1 km || 
|-id=872 bgcolor=#d6d6d6
| 532872 ||  || — || December 24, 2013 || Mount Lemmon || Mount Lemmon Survey ||  || align=right | 2.5 km || 
|-id=873 bgcolor=#fefefe
| 532873 ||  || — || December 25, 2013 || Mount Lemmon || Mount Lemmon Survey || H || align=right data-sort-value="0.66" | 660 m || 
|-id=874 bgcolor=#FFC2E0
| 532874 ||  || — || December 24, 2013 || Catalina || CSS || AMO || align=right data-sort-value="0.31" | 310 m || 
|-id=875 bgcolor=#d6d6d6
| 532875 ||  || — || January 14, 2010 || WISE || WISE ||  || align=right | 3.0 km || 
|-id=876 bgcolor=#E9E9E9
| 532876 ||  || — || November 27, 2013 || Haleakala || Pan-STARRS ||  || align=right | 1.6 km || 
|-id=877 bgcolor=#E9E9E9
| 532877 ||  || — || December 25, 2013 || Mount Lemmon || Mount Lemmon Survey ||  || align=right | 1.5 km || 
|-id=878 bgcolor=#d6d6d6
| 532878 ||  || — || December 4, 2013 || Haleakala || Pan-STARRS ||  || align=right | 3.0 km || 
|-id=879 bgcolor=#FA8072
| 532879 ||  || — || December 26, 2013 || Haleakala || Pan-STARRS || H || align=right data-sort-value="0.83" | 830 m || 
|-id=880 bgcolor=#d6d6d6
| 532880 ||  || — || December 5, 2008 || Kitt Peak || Spacewatch ||  || align=right | 2.8 km || 
|-id=881 bgcolor=#d6d6d6
| 532881 ||  || — || December 4, 2008 || Kitt Peak || Spacewatch ||  || align=right | 2.4 km || 
|-id=882 bgcolor=#E9E9E9
| 532882 ||  || — || November 11, 2009 || Mount Lemmon || Mount Lemmon Survey ||  || align=right data-sort-value="0.95" | 950 m || 
|-id=883 bgcolor=#E9E9E9
| 532883 ||  || — || April 25, 2007 || Kitt Peak || Spacewatch || HNS || align=right | 1.0 km || 
|-id=884 bgcolor=#d6d6d6
| 532884 ||  || — || October 26, 2013 || Kitt Peak || Spacewatch ||  || align=right | 2.9 km || 
|-id=885 bgcolor=#d6d6d6
| 532885 ||  || — || September 3, 2007 || Mount Lemmon || Mount Lemmon Survey ||  || align=right | 2.5 km || 
|-id=886 bgcolor=#d6d6d6
| 532886 ||  || — || January 18, 1998 || Kitt Peak || Spacewatch ||  || align=right | 2.8 km || 
|-id=887 bgcolor=#d6d6d6
| 532887 ||  || — || June 8, 2010 || WISE || WISE ||  || align=right | 3.2 km || 
|-id=888 bgcolor=#E9E9E9
| 532888 ||  || — || December 10, 2004 || Kitt Peak || Spacewatch ||  || align=right | 1.2 km || 
|-id=889 bgcolor=#d6d6d6
| 532889 ||  || — || October 19, 2007 || Catalina || CSS ||  || align=right | 2.4 km || 
|-id=890 bgcolor=#d6d6d6
| 532890 ||  || — || September 20, 2012 || Mount Lemmon || Mount Lemmon Survey ||  || align=right | 3.0 km || 
|-id=891 bgcolor=#d6d6d6
| 532891 ||  || — || November 28, 2013 || Mount Lemmon || Mount Lemmon Survey ||  || align=right | 2.7 km || 
|-id=892 bgcolor=#E9E9E9
| 532892 ||  || — || December 25, 2013 || Mount Lemmon || Mount Lemmon Survey ||  || align=right | 1.8 km || 
|-id=893 bgcolor=#E9E9E9
| 532893 ||  || — || December 25, 2013 || Mount Lemmon || Mount Lemmon Survey ||  || align=right | 1.6 km || 
|-id=894 bgcolor=#d6d6d6
| 532894 ||  || — || September 15, 2006 || Kitt Peak || Spacewatch ||  || align=right | 3.6 km || 
|-id=895 bgcolor=#d6d6d6
| 532895 ||  || — || December 26, 2013 || Mount Lemmon || Mount Lemmon Survey ||  || align=right | 2.9 km || 
|-id=896 bgcolor=#E9E9E9
| 532896 ||  || — || December 26, 2013 || Mount Lemmon || Mount Lemmon Survey ||  || align=right | 1.6 km || 
|-id=897 bgcolor=#d6d6d6
| 532897 ||  || — || December 26, 2013 || Mount Lemmon || Mount Lemmon Survey ||  || align=right | 2.6 km || 
|-id=898 bgcolor=#E9E9E9
| 532898 ||  || — || October 9, 2013 || Mount Lemmon || Mount Lemmon Survey ||  || align=right | 1.3 km || 
|-id=899 bgcolor=#d6d6d6
| 532899 ||  || — || October 26, 2013 || Mount Lemmon || Mount Lemmon Survey ||  || align=right | 2.8 km || 
|-id=900 bgcolor=#E9E9E9
| 532900 ||  || — || April 17, 2010 || WISE || WISE ||  || align=right | 2.2 km || 
|}

532901–533000 

|-bgcolor=#d6d6d6
| 532901 ||  || — || June 24, 2010 || WISE || WISE ||  || align=right | 3.3 km || 
|-id=902 bgcolor=#FA8072
| 532902 ||  || — || December 29, 2008 || Kitt Peak || Spacewatch || Hcritical || align=right data-sort-value="0.49" | 490 m || 
|-id=903 bgcolor=#d6d6d6
| 532903 ||  || — || November 27, 2013 || Haleakala || Pan-STARRS ||  || align=right | 2.5 km || 
|-id=904 bgcolor=#d6d6d6
| 532904 ||  || — || December 13, 2013 || Mount Lemmon || Mount Lemmon Survey ||  || align=right | 2.6 km || 
|-id=905 bgcolor=#d6d6d6
| 532905 ||  || — || December 5, 2008 || Kitt Peak || Spacewatch ||  || align=right | 1.7 km || 
|-id=906 bgcolor=#E9E9E9
| 532906 ||  || — || December 3, 2008 || Mount Lemmon || Mount Lemmon Survey ||  || align=right | 1.8 km || 
|-id=907 bgcolor=#d6d6d6
| 532907 ||  || — || October 10, 2007 || Mount Lemmon || Mount Lemmon Survey ||  || align=right | 2.7 km || 
|-id=908 bgcolor=#d6d6d6
| 532908 ||  || — || November 9, 2013 || Mount Lemmon || Mount Lemmon Survey ||  || align=right | 3.0 km || 
|-id=909 bgcolor=#E9E9E9
| 532909 ||  || — || May 6, 2003 || Kitt Peak || Spacewatch ||  || align=right | 2.1 km || 
|-id=910 bgcolor=#d6d6d6
| 532910 ||  || — || December 1, 2008 || Kitt Peak || Spacewatch ||  || align=right | 2.1 km || 
|-id=911 bgcolor=#d6d6d6
| 532911 ||  || — || April 21, 2012 || Mount Lemmon || Mount Lemmon Survey || EUP || align=right | 4.2 km || 
|-id=912 bgcolor=#E9E9E9
| 532912 ||  || — || January 26, 2006 || Kitt Peak || Spacewatch ||  || align=right data-sort-value="0.88" | 880 m || 
|-id=913 bgcolor=#d6d6d6
| 532913 ||  || — || November 28, 2013 || Mount Lemmon || Mount Lemmon Survey ||  || align=right | 2.4 km || 
|-id=914 bgcolor=#d6d6d6
| 532914 ||  || — || March 5, 2009 || Siding Spring || SSS ||  || align=right | 3.1 km || 
|-id=915 bgcolor=#d6d6d6
| 532915 ||  || — || December 25, 2013 || Mount Lemmon || Mount Lemmon Survey ||  || align=right | 2.2 km || 
|-id=916 bgcolor=#E9E9E9
| 532916 ||  || — || November 11, 2013 || Mount Lemmon || Mount Lemmon Survey ||  || align=right | 1.6 km || 
|-id=917 bgcolor=#fefefe
| 532917 ||  || — || December 25, 2013 || Haleakala || Pan-STARRS || H || align=right data-sort-value="0.59" | 590 m || 
|-id=918 bgcolor=#d6d6d6
| 532918 ||  || — || November 28, 2013 || Kitt Peak || Spacewatch ||  || align=right | 2.9 km || 
|-id=919 bgcolor=#E9E9E9
| 532919 ||  || — || November 18, 2008 || Kitt Peak || Spacewatch ||  || align=right | 2.0 km || 
|-id=920 bgcolor=#d6d6d6
| 532920 ||  || — || October 22, 2012 || Haleakala || Pan-STARRS ||  || align=right | 2.3 km || 
|-id=921 bgcolor=#d6d6d6
| 532921 ||  || — || August 25, 2012 || Catalina || CSS || EUP || align=right | 3.3 km || 
|-id=922 bgcolor=#d6d6d6
| 532922 ||  || — || October 20, 2007 || Mount Lemmon || Mount Lemmon Survey ||  || align=right | 2.5 km || 
|-id=923 bgcolor=#d6d6d6
| 532923 ||  || — || December 30, 2013 || Mount Lemmon || Mount Lemmon Survey ||  || align=right | 2.8 km || 
|-id=924 bgcolor=#d6d6d6
| 532924 ||  || — || December 30, 2013 || Mount Lemmon || Mount Lemmon Survey ||  || align=right | 2.1 km || 
|-id=925 bgcolor=#d6d6d6
| 532925 ||  || — || March 4, 2010 || WISE || WISE ||  || align=right | 4.8 km || 
|-id=926 bgcolor=#d6d6d6
| 532926 ||  || — || October 9, 2012 || Mount Lemmon || Mount Lemmon Survey ||  || align=right | 2.2 km || 
|-id=927 bgcolor=#d6d6d6
| 532927 ||  || — || August 26, 2012 || Haleakala || Pan-STARRS ||  || align=right | 2.7 km || 
|-id=928 bgcolor=#fefefe
| 532928 ||  || — || December 27, 2000 || Kitt Peak || Spacewatch || H || align=right data-sort-value="0.71" | 710 m || 
|-id=929 bgcolor=#d6d6d6
| 532929 ||  || — || October 18, 2007 || Mount Lemmon || Mount Lemmon Survey ||  || align=right | 1.9 km || 
|-id=930 bgcolor=#d6d6d6
| 532930 ||  || — || December 27, 2013 || Kitt Peak || Spacewatch ||  || align=right | 2.6 km || 
|-id=931 bgcolor=#d6d6d6
| 532931 ||  || — || August 10, 2012 || Kitt Peak || Spacewatch ||  || align=right | 3.0 km || 
|-id=932 bgcolor=#d6d6d6
| 532932 ||  || — || December 11, 2013 || Mount Lemmon || Mount Lemmon Survey ||  || align=right | 3.2 km || 
|-id=933 bgcolor=#d6d6d6
| 532933 ||  || — || February 10, 2010 || WISE || WISE ||  || align=right | 2.6 km || 
|-id=934 bgcolor=#E9E9E9
| 532934 ||  || — || April 7, 2010 || Catalina || CSS || JUN || align=right data-sort-value="0.89" | 890 m || 
|-id=935 bgcolor=#fefefe
| 532935 ||  || — || December 28, 2013 || Kitt Peak || Spacewatch || H || align=right data-sort-value="0.68" | 680 m || 
|-id=936 bgcolor=#fefefe
| 532936 ||  || — || January 20, 2001 || Kitt Peak || Spacewatch || H || align=right data-sort-value="0.64" | 640 m || 
|-id=937 bgcolor=#d6d6d6
| 532937 ||  || — || September 10, 2007 || Mount Lemmon || Mount Lemmon Survey ||  || align=right | 1.9 km || 
|-id=938 bgcolor=#E9E9E9
| 532938 ||  || — || December 13, 2013 || Mount Lemmon || Mount Lemmon Survey ||  || align=right | 1.9 km || 
|-id=939 bgcolor=#E9E9E9
| 532939 ||  || — || December 30, 2013 || Kitt Peak || Spacewatch ||  || align=right | 2.1 km || 
|-id=940 bgcolor=#d6d6d6
| 532940 ||  || — || December 30, 2013 || Kitt Peak || Spacewatch ||  || align=right | 2.8 km || 
|-id=941 bgcolor=#E9E9E9
| 532941 ||  || — || February 13, 2010 || Mount Lemmon || Mount Lemmon Survey || MIS || align=right | 1.9 km || 
|-id=942 bgcolor=#E9E9E9
| 532942 ||  || — || February 14, 2010 || Kitt Peak || Spacewatch ||  || align=right | 1.3 km || 
|-id=943 bgcolor=#E9E9E9
| 532943 ||  || — || December 11, 2013 || Mount Lemmon || Mount Lemmon Survey ||  || align=right | 1.5 km || 
|-id=944 bgcolor=#fefefe
| 532944 ||  || — || December 30, 2013 || Kitt Peak || Spacewatch || H || align=right data-sort-value="0.77" | 770 m || 
|-id=945 bgcolor=#d6d6d6
| 532945 ||  || — || October 8, 2007 || Kitt Peak || Spacewatch ||  || align=right | 2.3 km || 
|-id=946 bgcolor=#E9E9E9
| 532946 ||  || — || November 6, 2013 || Mount Lemmon || Mount Lemmon Survey ||  || align=right | 1.2 km || 
|-id=947 bgcolor=#d6d6d6
| 532947 ||  || — || May 31, 2011 || Mount Lemmon || Mount Lemmon Survey ||  || align=right | 3.2 km || 
|-id=948 bgcolor=#E9E9E9
| 532948 ||  || — || December 19, 2004 || Mount Lemmon || Mount Lemmon Survey ||  || align=right | 1.7 km || 
|-id=949 bgcolor=#E9E9E9
| 532949 ||  || — || February 2, 2005 || Socorro || LINEAR ||  || align=right | 2.6 km || 
|-id=950 bgcolor=#E9E9E9
| 532950 ||  || — || June 21, 2010 || WISE || WISE ||  || align=right | 2.2 km || 
|-id=951 bgcolor=#E9E9E9
| 532951 ||  || — || September 23, 2008 || Catalina || CSS ||  || align=right | 2.1 km || 
|-id=952 bgcolor=#d6d6d6
| 532952 ||  || — || October 19, 2012 || Mount Lemmon || Mount Lemmon Survey ||  || align=right | 3.3 km || 
|-id=953 bgcolor=#d6d6d6
| 532953 ||  || — || February 3, 2009 || Kitt Peak || Spacewatch ||  || align=right | 2.0 km || 
|-id=954 bgcolor=#d6d6d6
| 532954 ||  || — || February 9, 2010 || WISE || WISE ||  || align=right | 3.3 km || 
|-id=955 bgcolor=#fefefe
| 532955 ||  || — || September 14, 2010 || Catalina || CSS || H || align=right data-sort-value="0.51" | 510 m || 
|-id=956 bgcolor=#d6d6d6
| 532956 ||  || — || October 18, 2012 || Haleakala || Pan-STARRS || THM || align=right | 1.9 km || 
|-id=957 bgcolor=#E9E9E9
| 532957 ||  || — || January 8, 2006 || Mount Lemmon || Mount Lemmon Survey ||  || align=right data-sort-value="0.93" | 930 m || 
|-id=958 bgcolor=#fefefe
| 532958 ||  || — || December 11, 2013 || Mount Lemmon || Mount Lemmon Survey || H || align=right data-sort-value="0.62" | 620 m || 
|-id=959 bgcolor=#E9E9E9
| 532959 ||  || — || November 6, 2008 || Mount Lemmon || Mount Lemmon Survey ||  || align=right | 1.3 km || 
|-id=960 bgcolor=#E9E9E9
| 532960 ||  || — || December 11, 2013 || Haleakala || Pan-STARRS ||  || align=right | 1.6 km || 
|-id=961 bgcolor=#d6d6d6
| 532961 ||  || — || August 26, 2012 || Haleakala || Pan-STARRS || THM || align=right | 1.6 km || 
|-id=962 bgcolor=#d6d6d6
| 532962 ||  || — || December 30, 2013 || Haleakala || Pan-STARRS ||  || align=right | 3.1 km || 
|-id=963 bgcolor=#d6d6d6
| 532963 ||  || — || December 30, 2013 || Kitt Peak || Spacewatch ||  || align=right | 2.8 km || 
|-id=964 bgcolor=#E9E9E9
| 532964 ||  || — || March 12, 2010 || Mount Lemmon || Mount Lemmon Survey ||  || align=right | 1.2 km || 
|-id=965 bgcolor=#d6d6d6
| 532965 ||  || — || November 20, 2008 || Kitt Peak || Spacewatch ||  || align=right | 2.3 km || 
|-id=966 bgcolor=#d6d6d6
| 532966 ||  || — || December 4, 2013 || Haleakala || Pan-STARRS ||  || align=right | 3.8 km || 
|-id=967 bgcolor=#E9E9E9
| 532967 ||  || — || April 29, 2010 || WISE || WISE ||  || align=right | 2.4 km || 
|-id=968 bgcolor=#d6d6d6
| 532968 ||  || — || December 6, 2013 || Haleakala || Pan-STARRS ||  || align=right | 2.5 km || 
|-id=969 bgcolor=#d6d6d6
| 532969 ||  || — || April 26, 2010 || Mount Lemmon || Mount Lemmon Survey ||  || align=right | 2.9 km || 
|-id=970 bgcolor=#d6d6d6
| 532970 ||  || — || January 16, 2009 || Kitt Peak || Spacewatch ||  || align=right | 2.9 km || 
|-id=971 bgcolor=#d6d6d6
| 532971 ||  || — || April 22, 2010 || WISE || WISE ||  || align=right | 2.9 km || 
|-id=972 bgcolor=#d6d6d6
| 532972 ||  || — || November 28, 2013 || Mount Lemmon || Mount Lemmon Survey ||  || align=right | 2.1 km || 
|-id=973 bgcolor=#d6d6d6
| 532973 ||  || — || December 28, 2013 || Kitt Peak || Spacewatch ||  || align=right | 2.4 km || 
|-id=974 bgcolor=#d6d6d6
| 532974 ||  || — || September 20, 2011 || Haleakala || Pan-STARRS ||  || align=right | 2.7 km || 
|-id=975 bgcolor=#d6d6d6
| 532975 ||  || — || January 13, 2003 || Kitt Peak || Spacewatch ||  || align=right | 3.6 km || 
|-id=976 bgcolor=#d6d6d6
| 532976 ||  || — || September 24, 2007 || Kitt Peak || Spacewatch ||  || align=right | 2.2 km || 
|-id=977 bgcolor=#d6d6d6
| 532977 ||  || — || December 25, 2013 || Mount Lemmon || Mount Lemmon Survey ||  || align=right | 2.2 km || 
|-id=978 bgcolor=#E9E9E9
| 532978 ||  || — || March 10, 2005 || Mount Lemmon || Mount Lemmon Survey ||  || align=right | 2.2 km || 
|-id=979 bgcolor=#d6d6d6
| 532979 ||  || — || October 21, 2007 || Mount Lemmon || Mount Lemmon Survey ||  || align=right | 2.5 km || 
|-id=980 bgcolor=#E9E9E9
| 532980 ||  || — || October 15, 2012 || Haleakala || Pan-STARRS ||  || align=right | 1.6 km || 
|-id=981 bgcolor=#d6d6d6
| 532981 ||  || — || November 8, 2007 || Kitt Peak || Spacewatch ||  || align=right | 2.1 km || 
|-id=982 bgcolor=#d6d6d6
| 532982 ||  || — || February 27, 2009 || Kitt Peak || Spacewatch ||  || align=right | 2.0 km || 
|-id=983 bgcolor=#d6d6d6
| 532983 ||  || — || October 9, 2012 || Haleakala || Pan-STARRS ||  || align=right | 2.4 km || 
|-id=984 bgcolor=#d6d6d6
| 532984 ||  || — || December 30, 2013 || Kitt Peak || Spacewatch ||  || align=right | 2.9 km || 
|-id=985 bgcolor=#E9E9E9
| 532985 ||  || — || October 3, 2003 || Kitt Peak || Spacewatch ||  || align=right | 1.9 km || 
|-id=986 bgcolor=#E9E9E9
| 532986 ||  || — || November 19, 2003 || Kitt Peak || Spacewatch ||  || align=right | 1.8 km || 
|-id=987 bgcolor=#E9E9E9
| 532987 ||  || — || December 29, 2013 || Haleakala || Pan-STARRS ||  || align=right | 1.1 km || 
|-id=988 bgcolor=#E9E9E9
| 532988 ||  || — || October 8, 2012 || Haleakala || Pan-STARRS ||  || align=right | 1.9 km || 
|-id=989 bgcolor=#E9E9E9
| 532989 ||  || — || February 27, 2006 || Kitt Peak || Spacewatch ||  || align=right | 1.5 km || 
|-id=990 bgcolor=#E9E9E9
| 532990 ||  || — || April 8, 2006 || Catalina || CSS ||  || align=right | 1.7 km || 
|-id=991 bgcolor=#d6d6d6
| 532991 ||  || — || October 23, 2012 || Haleakala || Pan-STARRS ||  || align=right | 3.4 km || 
|-id=992 bgcolor=#d6d6d6
| 532992 ||  || — || May 11, 2005 || Kitt Peak || Spacewatch ||  || align=right | 2.9 km || 
|-id=993 bgcolor=#d6d6d6
| 532993 ||  || — || December 25, 2013 || Mount Lemmon || Mount Lemmon Survey ||  || align=right | 2.1 km || 
|-id=994 bgcolor=#d6d6d6
| 532994 ||  || — || December 25, 2013 || Kitt Peak || Spacewatch ||  || align=right | 2.2 km || 
|-id=995 bgcolor=#d6d6d6
| 532995 ||  || — || December 30, 2013 || Mount Lemmon || Mount Lemmon Survey ||  || align=right | 2.6 km || 
|-id=996 bgcolor=#d6d6d6
| 532996 ||  || — || December 31, 2013 || Kitt Peak || Spacewatch ||  || align=right | 2.7 km || 
|-id=997 bgcolor=#E9E9E9
| 532997 ||  || — || December 29, 2013 || Haleakala || Pan-STARRS ||  || align=right | 1.4 km || 
|-id=998 bgcolor=#d6d6d6
| 532998 ||  || — || November 13, 2007 || Mount Lemmon || Mount Lemmon Survey ||  || align=right | 2.7 km || 
|-id=999 bgcolor=#d6d6d6
| 532999 ||  || — || November 8, 2007 || Kitt Peak || Spacewatch ||  || align=right | 2.5 km || 
|-id=000 bgcolor=#d6d6d6
| 533000 ||  || — || October 31, 2013 || Mount Lemmon || Mount Lemmon Survey ||  || align=right | 2.7 km || 
|}

References

External links 
 Discovery Circumstances: Numbered Minor Planets (530001)–(535000) (IAU Minor Planet Center)

0532